

492001–492100 

|-bgcolor=#fefefe
| 492001 ||  || — || March 2, 2009 || Mount Lemmon || Mount Lemmon Survey || — || align=right data-sort-value="0.74" | 740 m || 
|-id=002 bgcolor=#fefefe
| 492002 ||  || — || January 29, 2009 || Kitt Peak || Spacewatch || — || align=right data-sort-value="0.66" | 660 m || 
|-id=003 bgcolor=#fefefe
| 492003 ||  || — || September 12, 2007 || Mount Lemmon || Mount Lemmon Survey || — || align=right data-sort-value="0.78" | 780 m || 
|-id=004 bgcolor=#fefefe
| 492004 ||  || — || March 13, 2013 || Kitt Peak || Spacewatch || NYS || align=right data-sort-value="0.72" | 720 m || 
|-id=005 bgcolor=#E9E9E9
| 492005 ||  || — || October 25, 2011 || Haleakala || Pan-STARRS || — || align=right | 1.4 km || 
|-id=006 bgcolor=#fefefe
| 492006 ||  || — || February 4, 2005 || Mount Lemmon || Mount Lemmon Survey || NYS || align=right data-sort-value="0.56" | 560 m || 
|-id=007 bgcolor=#fefefe
| 492007 ||  || — || September 10, 2007 || Mount Lemmon || Mount Lemmon Survey || — || align=right data-sort-value="0.90" | 900 m || 
|-id=008 bgcolor=#fefefe
| 492008 ||  || — || September 24, 2011 || Haleakala || Pan-STARRS || V || align=right data-sort-value="0.59" | 590 m || 
|-id=009 bgcolor=#E9E9E9
| 492009 ||  || — || March 9, 2005 || Mount Lemmon || Mount Lemmon Survey || — || align=right | 1.1 km || 
|-id=010 bgcolor=#E9E9E9
| 492010 ||  || — || October 25, 2011 || Haleakala || Pan-STARRS || — || align=right | 1.6 km || 
|-id=011 bgcolor=#fefefe
| 492011 ||  || — || February 1, 2009 || Kitt Peak || Spacewatch || MAS || align=right data-sort-value="0.64" | 640 m || 
|-id=012 bgcolor=#fefefe
| 492012 ||  || — || March 13, 2013 || Haleakala || Pan-STARRS || V || align=right data-sort-value="0.62" | 620 m || 
|-id=013 bgcolor=#fefefe
| 492013 ||  || — || March 17, 2009 || Kitt Peak || Spacewatch || — || align=right data-sort-value="0.78" | 780 m || 
|-id=014 bgcolor=#E9E9E9
| 492014 ||  || — || March 7, 2013 || Kitt Peak || Spacewatch || — || align=right data-sort-value="0.73" | 730 m || 
|-id=015 bgcolor=#E9E9E9
| 492015 ||  || — || September 30, 2006 || Catalina || CSS || — || align=right | 2.3 km || 
|-id=016 bgcolor=#E9E9E9
| 492016 ||  || — || March 7, 2013 || Kitt Peak || Spacewatch || — || align=right data-sort-value="0.85" | 850 m || 
|-id=017 bgcolor=#fefefe
| 492017 ||  || — || February 14, 2013 || Kitt Peak || Spacewatch || — || align=right data-sort-value="0.79" | 790 m || 
|-id=018 bgcolor=#E9E9E9
| 492018 ||  || — || April 1, 2013 || Catalina || CSS || — || align=right | 1.5 km || 
|-id=019 bgcolor=#fefefe
| 492019 ||  || — || September 26, 2006 || Mount Lemmon || Mount Lemmon Survey || — || align=right data-sort-value="0.68" | 680 m || 
|-id=020 bgcolor=#E9E9E9
| 492020 ||  || — || March 19, 2013 || Haleakala || Pan-STARRS || — || align=right | 1.5 km || 
|-id=021 bgcolor=#E9E9E9
| 492021 ||  || — || September 25, 2006 || Kitt Peak || Spacewatch || — || align=right data-sort-value="0.76" | 760 m || 
|-id=022 bgcolor=#E9E9E9
| 492022 ||  || — || June 2, 2009 || Mount Lemmon || Mount Lemmon Survey || — || align=right | 1.6 km || 
|-id=023 bgcolor=#E9E9E9
| 492023 ||  || — || March 16, 2013 || Kitt Peak || Spacewatch || MAR || align=right data-sort-value="0.82" | 820 m || 
|-id=024 bgcolor=#E9E9E9
| 492024 ||  || — || October 25, 2011 || Haleakala || Pan-STARRS || — || align=right data-sort-value="0.97" | 970 m || 
|-id=025 bgcolor=#E9E9E9
| 492025 ||  || — || April 2, 2009 || Kitt Peak || Spacewatch || — || align=right data-sort-value="0.74" | 740 m || 
|-id=026 bgcolor=#fefefe
| 492026 ||  || — || March 1, 2009 || Kitt Peak || Spacewatch || NYS || align=right data-sort-value="0.61" | 610 m || 
|-id=027 bgcolor=#E9E9E9
| 492027 ||  || — || March 15, 2013 || Kitt Peak || Spacewatch || KON || align=right | 2.2 km || 
|-id=028 bgcolor=#E9E9E9
| 492028 ||  || — || April 6, 2005 || Kitt Peak || Spacewatch || — || align=right data-sort-value="0.81" | 810 m || 
|-id=029 bgcolor=#fefefe
| 492029 ||  || — || August 28, 2011 || Haleakala || Pan-STARRS || — || align=right data-sort-value="0.94" | 940 m || 
|-id=030 bgcolor=#E9E9E9
| 492030 ||  || — || April 9, 2013 || Haleakala || Pan-STARRS || KON || align=right | 2.0 km || 
|-id=031 bgcolor=#E9E9E9
| 492031 ||  || — || December 31, 2007 || Mount Lemmon || Mount Lemmon Survey || — || align=right | 1.2 km || 
|-id=032 bgcolor=#fefefe
| 492032 ||  || — || March 2, 2009 || Mount Lemmon || Mount Lemmon Survey || — || align=right data-sort-value="0.93" | 930 m || 
|-id=033 bgcolor=#E9E9E9
| 492033 ||  || — || March 31, 2009 || Kitt Peak || Spacewatch || — || align=right data-sort-value="0.79" | 790 m || 
|-id=034 bgcolor=#fefefe
| 492034 ||  || — || March 5, 2013 || Mount Lemmon || Mount Lemmon Survey || — || align=right data-sort-value="0.89" | 890 m || 
|-id=035 bgcolor=#E9E9E9
| 492035 ||  || — || December 22, 2012 || Haleakala || Pan-STARRS || — || align=right | 1.4 km || 
|-id=036 bgcolor=#E9E9E9
| 492036 ||  || — || April 11, 2013 || Kitt Peak || Spacewatch || — || align=right | 1.6 km || 
|-id=037 bgcolor=#d6d6d6
| 492037 ||  || — || April 6, 2013 || Haleakala || Pan-STARRS || — || align=right | 3.0 km || 
|-id=038 bgcolor=#E9E9E9
| 492038 ||  || — || March 14, 2013 || Mount Lemmon || Mount Lemmon Survey || — || align=right | 1.3 km || 
|-id=039 bgcolor=#E9E9E9
| 492039 ||  || — || June 1, 2009 || Mount Lemmon || Mount Lemmon Survey || — || align=right data-sort-value="0.82" | 820 m || 
|-id=040 bgcolor=#E9E9E9
| 492040 ||  || — || March 19, 2009 || Kitt Peak || Spacewatch || — || align=right data-sort-value="0.80" | 800 m || 
|-id=041 bgcolor=#fefefe
| 492041 ||  || — || March 25, 2006 || Kitt Peak || Spacewatch || — || align=right data-sort-value="0.68" | 680 m || 
|-id=042 bgcolor=#E9E9E9
| 492042 ||  || — || May 18, 2009 || Mount Lemmon || Mount Lemmon Survey || — || align=right data-sort-value="0.86" | 860 m || 
|-id=043 bgcolor=#E9E9E9
| 492043 ||  || — || May 1, 2009 || Mount Lemmon || Mount Lemmon Survey || — || align=right data-sort-value="0.91" | 910 m || 
|-id=044 bgcolor=#fefefe
| 492044 ||  || — || April 4, 2013 || Haleakala || Pan-STARRS || — || align=right | 1.1 km || 
|-id=045 bgcolor=#E9E9E9
| 492045 ||  || — || April 2, 2009 || Mount Lemmon || Mount Lemmon Survey || — || align=right data-sort-value="0.85" | 850 m || 
|-id=046 bgcolor=#E9E9E9
| 492046 ||  || — || December 23, 2012 || Haleakala || Pan-STARRS || (1547) || align=right | 1.4 km || 
|-id=047 bgcolor=#E9E9E9
| 492047 ||  || — || March 19, 2013 || Haleakala || Pan-STARRS || — || align=right | 1.7 km || 
|-id=048 bgcolor=#E9E9E9
| 492048 ||  || — || April 11, 2013 || Kitt Peak || Spacewatch || — || align=right | 2.1 km || 
|-id=049 bgcolor=#E9E9E9
| 492049 ||  || — || May 16, 2009 || Mount Lemmon || Mount Lemmon Survey || — || align=right | 1.1 km || 
|-id=050 bgcolor=#E9E9E9
| 492050 ||  || — || April 18, 2013 || Kitt Peak || Spacewatch || — || align=right data-sort-value="0.92" | 920 m || 
|-id=051 bgcolor=#E9E9E9
| 492051 ||  || — || April 20, 2009 || Kitt Peak || Spacewatch || (1547) || align=right | 1.2 km || 
|-id=052 bgcolor=#E9E9E9
| 492052 ||  || — || March 18, 2013 || Mount Lemmon || Mount Lemmon Survey || — || align=right | 1.5 km || 
|-id=053 bgcolor=#E9E9E9
| 492053 ||  || — || May 2, 2009 || Kitt Peak || Spacewatch || EUN || align=right data-sort-value="0.98" | 980 m || 
|-id=054 bgcolor=#E9E9E9
| 492054 ||  || — || October 13, 2006 || Kitt Peak || Spacewatch || — || align=right | 1.3 km || 
|-id=055 bgcolor=#E9E9E9
| 492055 ||  || — || March 13, 2013 || Mount Lemmon || Mount Lemmon Survey || EUN || align=right | 1.3 km || 
|-id=056 bgcolor=#E9E9E9
| 492056 ||  || — || June 17, 2009 || Kitt Peak || Spacewatch || JUN || align=right data-sort-value="0.91" | 910 m || 
|-id=057 bgcolor=#E9E9E9
| 492057 ||  || — || October 28, 2010 || Mount Lemmon || Mount Lemmon Survey || — || align=right | 1.4 km || 
|-id=058 bgcolor=#E9E9E9
| 492058 ||  || — || January 21, 2013 || Haleakala || Pan-STARRS || — || align=right | 1.4 km || 
|-id=059 bgcolor=#E9E9E9
| 492059 ||  || — || April 11, 2013 || Mount Lemmon || Mount Lemmon Survey || — || align=right | 2.1 km || 
|-id=060 bgcolor=#fefefe
| 492060 ||  || — || June 11, 2010 || WISE || WISE || — || align=right | 2.6 km || 
|-id=061 bgcolor=#E9E9E9
| 492061 ||  || — || April 9, 2013 || Haleakala || Pan-STARRS || — || align=right data-sort-value="0.82" | 820 m || 
|-id=062 bgcolor=#E9E9E9
| 492062 ||  || — || December 18, 2007 || Mount Lemmon || Mount Lemmon Survey || — || align=right | 1.0 km || 
|-id=063 bgcolor=#d6d6d6
| 492063 ||  || — || April 9, 2013 || Haleakala || Pan-STARRS || — || align=right | 2.0 km || 
|-id=064 bgcolor=#fefefe
| 492064 ||  || — || December 14, 2003 || Kitt Peak || Spacewatch || — || align=right data-sort-value="0.72" | 720 m || 
|-id=065 bgcolor=#E9E9E9
| 492065 ||  || — || October 19, 1998 || Kitt Peak || Spacewatch || — || align=right | 1.1 km || 
|-id=066 bgcolor=#E9E9E9
| 492066 ||  || — || April 8, 2013 || Mount Lemmon || Mount Lemmon Survey || — || align=right | 1.2 km || 
|-id=067 bgcolor=#E9E9E9
| 492067 ||  || — || April 9, 2013 || Haleakala || Pan-STARRS || — || align=right | 1.8 km || 
|-id=068 bgcolor=#E9E9E9
| 492068 ||  || — || January 12, 2008 || Kitt Peak || Spacewatch || — || align=right | 1.0 km || 
|-id=069 bgcolor=#E9E9E9
| 492069 ||  || — || May 14, 2009 || Kitt Peak || Spacewatch || MAR || align=right data-sort-value="0.81" | 810 m || 
|-id=070 bgcolor=#E9E9E9
| 492070 ||  || — || October 17, 2010 || Mount Lemmon || Mount Lemmon Survey || — || align=right data-sort-value="0.86" | 860 m || 
|-id=071 bgcolor=#E9E9E9
| 492071 ||  || — || June 4, 2005 || Kitt Peak || Spacewatch || — || align=right data-sort-value="0.79" | 790 m || 
|-id=072 bgcolor=#E9E9E9
| 492072 ||  || — || May 16, 2005 || Mount Lemmon || Mount Lemmon Survey || — || align=right data-sort-value="0.58" | 580 m || 
|-id=073 bgcolor=#E9E9E9
| 492073 ||  || — || June 15, 2005 || Mount Lemmon || Mount Lemmon Survey || — || align=right | 1.1 km || 
|-id=074 bgcolor=#E9E9E9
| 492074 ||  || — || May 1, 2013 || Kitt Peak || Spacewatch || — || align=right | 1.3 km || 
|-id=075 bgcolor=#E9E9E9
| 492075 ||  || — || February 12, 2008 || Mount Lemmon || Mount Lemmon Survey || — || align=right | 1.8 km || 
|-id=076 bgcolor=#E9E9E9
| 492076 ||  || — || May 13, 2009 || Kitt Peak || Spacewatch || EUN || align=right | 1.1 km || 
|-id=077 bgcolor=#d6d6d6
| 492077 ||  || — || November 24, 2011 || Haleakala || Pan-STARRS || — || align=right | 2.6 km || 
|-id=078 bgcolor=#E9E9E9
| 492078 ||  || — || April 13, 2013 || Haleakala || Pan-STARRS || — || align=right | 1.3 km || 
|-id=079 bgcolor=#fefefe
| 492079 ||  || — || March 18, 2009 || Kitt Peak || Spacewatch || — || align=right data-sort-value="0.91" | 910 m || 
|-id=080 bgcolor=#E9E9E9
| 492080 ||  || — || April 18, 2009 || Mount Lemmon || Mount Lemmon Survey || — || align=right data-sort-value="0.90" | 900 m || 
|-id=081 bgcolor=#E9E9E9
| 492081 ||  || — || April 7, 2013 || Mount Lemmon || Mount Lemmon Survey || EUN || align=right | 1.2 km || 
|-id=082 bgcolor=#E9E9E9
| 492082 ||  || — || April 18, 2013 || Siding Spring || SSS || — || align=right | 1.7 km || 
|-id=083 bgcolor=#E9E9E9
| 492083 ||  || — || January 26, 2012 || Haleakala || Pan-STARRS || — || align=right data-sort-value="0.90" | 900 m || 
|-id=084 bgcolor=#E9E9E9
| 492084 ||  || — || April 10, 2013 || Mount Lemmon || Mount Lemmon Survey || RAF || align=right | 1.2 km || 
|-id=085 bgcolor=#E9E9E9
| 492085 ||  || — || April 16, 2013 || Haleakala || Pan-STARRS || — || align=right | 1.2 km || 
|-id=086 bgcolor=#E9E9E9
| 492086 ||  || — || March 15, 2004 || Kitt Peak || Spacewatch || — || align=right | 1.2 km || 
|-id=087 bgcolor=#d6d6d6
| 492087 ||  || — || May 15, 2013 || Haleakala || Pan-STARRS || EOS || align=right | 1.8 km || 
|-id=088 bgcolor=#E9E9E9
| 492088 ||  || — || May 10, 2013 || Kitt Peak || Spacewatch || — || align=right | 1.9 km || 
|-id=089 bgcolor=#E9E9E9
| 492089 ||  || — || March 14, 2013 || Kitt Peak || Spacewatch || — || align=right data-sort-value="0.81" | 810 m || 
|-id=090 bgcolor=#E9E9E9
| 492090 ||  || — || April 13, 2013 || Haleakala || Pan-STARRS || — || align=right data-sort-value="0.82" | 820 m || 
|-id=091 bgcolor=#E9E9E9
| 492091 ||  || — || April 16, 2013 || Haleakala || Pan-STARRS || — || align=right | 1.1 km || 
|-id=092 bgcolor=#d6d6d6
| 492092 ||  || — || August 16, 2009 || Catalina || CSS || BRA || align=right | 1.5 km || 
|-id=093 bgcolor=#E9E9E9
| 492093 ||  || — || January 30, 2012 || Mount Lemmon || Mount Lemmon Survey || — || align=right | 1.7 km || 
|-id=094 bgcolor=#E9E9E9
| 492094 ||  || — || May 15, 2005 || Mount Lemmon || Mount Lemmon Survey || — || align=right data-sort-value="0.89" | 890 m || 
|-id=095 bgcolor=#E9E9E9
| 492095 ||  || — || May 13, 2009 || Kitt Peak || Spacewatch || MAR || align=right data-sort-value="0.94" | 940 m || 
|-id=096 bgcolor=#E9E9E9
| 492096 ||  || — || September 30, 2010 || Mount Lemmon || Mount Lemmon Survey || — || align=right data-sort-value="0.76" | 760 m || 
|-id=097 bgcolor=#fefefe
| 492097 ||  || — || April 2, 2009 || Mount Lemmon || Mount Lemmon Survey || MAS || align=right data-sort-value="0.69" | 690 m || 
|-id=098 bgcolor=#E9E9E9
| 492098 ||  || — || April 15, 2013 || Haleakala || Pan-STARRS || — || align=right | 1.9 km || 
|-id=099 bgcolor=#E9E9E9
| 492099 ||  || — || October 28, 2006 || Kitt Peak || Spacewatch || EUN || align=right data-sort-value="0.97" | 970 m || 
|-id=100 bgcolor=#E9E9E9
| 492100 ||  || — || March 17, 2004 || Kitt Peak || Spacewatch || MIS || align=right | 1.9 km || 
|}

492101–492200 

|-bgcolor=#E9E9E9
| 492101 ||  || — || April 22, 2013 || Mount Lemmon || Mount Lemmon Survey || — || align=right | 1.4 km || 
|-id=102 bgcolor=#E9E9E9
| 492102 ||  || — || March 14, 2013 || Mount Lemmon || Mount Lemmon Survey || — || align=right data-sort-value="0.99" | 990 m || 
|-id=103 bgcolor=#E9E9E9
| 492103 ||  || — || October 28, 2010 || Mount Lemmon || Mount Lemmon Survey || BRG || align=right | 1.3 km || 
|-id=104 bgcolor=#E9E9E9
| 492104 ||  || — || October 31, 2010 || Mount Lemmon || Mount Lemmon Survey || — || align=right data-sort-value="0.97" | 970 m || 
|-id=105 bgcolor=#E9E9E9
| 492105 ||  || — || November 25, 2011 || Haleakala || Pan-STARRS || — || align=right | 1.6 km || 
|-id=106 bgcolor=#E9E9E9
| 492106 ||  || — || November 20, 2006 || Kitt Peak || Spacewatch || EUN || align=right | 1.2 km || 
|-id=107 bgcolor=#E9E9E9
| 492107 ||  || — || May 20, 2013 || Catalina || CSS || — || align=right data-sort-value="0.89" | 890 m || 
|-id=108 bgcolor=#E9E9E9
| 492108 ||  || — || February 14, 2013 || Haleakala || Pan-STARRS || — || align=right | 1.2 km || 
|-id=109 bgcolor=#E9E9E9
| 492109 ||  || — || April 12, 2013 || Haleakala || Pan-STARRS || — || align=right | 1.6 km || 
|-id=110 bgcolor=#E9E9E9
| 492110 ||  || — || March 10, 2008 || Kitt Peak || Spacewatch || — || align=right | 1.8 km || 
|-id=111 bgcolor=#E9E9E9
| 492111 ||  || — || April 29, 2009 || Mount Lemmon || Mount Lemmon Survey || — || align=right data-sort-value="0.87" | 870 m || 
|-id=112 bgcolor=#E9E9E9
| 492112 Jordicamarasa ||  ||  || February 28, 2008 || Mount Lemmon || Mount Lemmon Survey || KON || align=right | 2.2 km || 
|-id=113 bgcolor=#E9E9E9
| 492113 ||  || — || June 17, 2009 || La Sagra || OAM Obs. || — || align=right | 1.2 km || 
|-id=114 bgcolor=#E9E9E9
| 492114 ||  || — || April 12, 2013 || Haleakala || Pan-STARRS || — || align=right | 1.4 km || 
|-id=115 bgcolor=#E9E9E9
| 492115 ||  || — || November 18, 2006 || Mount Lemmon || Mount Lemmon Survey || — || align=right | 2.1 km || 
|-id=116 bgcolor=#E9E9E9
| 492116 ||  || — || April 16, 2013 || Haleakala || Pan-STARRS || — || align=right | 1.5 km || 
|-id=117 bgcolor=#E9E9E9
| 492117 ||  || — || June 19, 2009 || Kitt Peak || Spacewatch || — || align=right | 1.5 km || 
|-id=118 bgcolor=#E9E9E9
| 492118 ||  || — || April 21, 2013 || Mount Lemmon || Mount Lemmon Survey || — || align=right data-sort-value="0.96" | 960 m || 
|-id=119 bgcolor=#E9E9E9
| 492119 ||  || — || May 16, 2013 || Haleakala || Pan-STARRS || — || align=right | 1.5 km || 
|-id=120 bgcolor=#E9E9E9
| 492120 ||  || — || September 16, 2009 || Mount Lemmon || Mount Lemmon Survey || — || align=right | 2.2 km || 
|-id=121 bgcolor=#E9E9E9
| 492121 ||  || — || February 2, 2008 || Kitt Peak || Spacewatch || EUN || align=right | 1.1 km || 
|-id=122 bgcolor=#E9E9E9
| 492122 ||  || — || September 18, 2010 || Mount Lemmon || Mount Lemmon Survey || — || align=right | 1.3 km || 
|-id=123 bgcolor=#E9E9E9
| 492123 ||  || — || April 15, 2013 || Haleakala || Pan-STARRS || — || align=right | 1.0 km || 
|-id=124 bgcolor=#E9E9E9
| 492124 ||  || — || February 2, 2008 || Kitt Peak || Spacewatch || — || align=right | 1.2 km || 
|-id=125 bgcolor=#E9E9E9
| 492125 ||  || — || December 29, 2011 || Mount Lemmon || Mount Lemmon Survey || — || align=right | 1.3 km || 
|-id=126 bgcolor=#E9E9E9
| 492126 ||  || — || May 16, 2013 || Haleakala || Pan-STARRS || — || align=right | 1.0 km || 
|-id=127 bgcolor=#E9E9E9
| 492127 ||  || — || May 15, 2013 || Haleakala || Pan-STARRS || GEF || align=right | 1.0 km || 
|-id=128 bgcolor=#E9E9E9
| 492128 ||  || — || May 15, 2013 || Haleakala || Pan-STARRS || KON || align=right | 1.9 km || 
|-id=129 bgcolor=#E9E9E9
| 492129 ||  || — || August 17, 2009 || Kitt Peak || Spacewatch || — || align=right | 2.6 km || 
|-id=130 bgcolor=#E9E9E9
| 492130 ||  || — || October 3, 2010 || Kitt Peak || Spacewatch || EUN || align=right | 1.1 km || 
|-id=131 bgcolor=#E9E9E9
| 492131 ||  || — || May 15, 2013 || Haleakala || Pan-STARRS || — || align=right | 1.7 km || 
|-id=132 bgcolor=#E9E9E9
| 492132 ||  || — || October 10, 2009 || La Sagra || OAM Obs. || — || align=right | 2.7 km || 
|-id=133 bgcolor=#d6d6d6
| 492133 ||  || — || June 18, 2013 || Haleakala || Pan-STARRS || — || align=right | 2.9 km || 
|-id=134 bgcolor=#d6d6d6
| 492134 ||  || — || June 18, 2013 || Haleakala || Pan-STARRS || — || align=right | 2.8 km || 
|-id=135 bgcolor=#E9E9E9
| 492135 ||  || — || February 27, 2012 || Haleakala || Pan-STARRS || AGN || align=right | 1.0 km || 
|-id=136 bgcolor=#E9E9E9
| 492136 ||  || — || January 19, 2012 || Haleakala || Pan-STARRS || — || align=right | 1.3 km || 
|-id=137 bgcolor=#d6d6d6
| 492137 ||  || — || October 26, 2009 || Kitt Peak || Spacewatch || — || align=right | 2.7 km || 
|-id=138 bgcolor=#d6d6d6
| 492138 ||  || — || July 6, 2013 || Haleakala || Pan-STARRS || — || align=right | 2.6 km || 
|-id=139 bgcolor=#fefefe
| 492139 ||  || — || October 11, 2010 || Mount Lemmon || Mount Lemmon Survey || — || align=right data-sort-value="0.68" | 680 m || 
|-id=140 bgcolor=#d6d6d6
| 492140 ||  || — || April 26, 2007 || Mount Lemmon || Mount Lemmon Survey || — || align=right | 2.0 km || 
|-id=141 bgcolor=#d6d6d6
| 492141 ||  || — || March 5, 2006 || Kitt Peak || Spacewatch || — || align=right | 2.7 km || 
|-id=142 bgcolor=#fefefe
| 492142 ||  || — || May 13, 2009 || Kitt Peak || Spacewatch || — || align=right data-sort-value="0.64" | 640 m || 
|-id=143 bgcolor=#FFC2E0
| 492143 ||  || — || July 16, 2013 || Haleakala || Pan-STARRS || APO +1km || align=right data-sort-value="0.98" | 980 m || 
|-id=144 bgcolor=#d6d6d6
| 492144 ||  || — || October 9, 2008 || Mount Lemmon || Mount Lemmon Survey || — || align=right | 2.9 km || 
|-id=145 bgcolor=#E9E9E9
| 492145 ||  || — || April 21, 2013 || Haleakala || Pan-STARRS || — || align=right | 2.1 km || 
|-id=146 bgcolor=#d6d6d6
| 492146 ||  || — || April 15, 2012 || Haleakala || Pan-STARRS || EMA || align=right | 3.4 km || 
|-id=147 bgcolor=#d6d6d6
| 492147 ||  || — || July 13, 2013 || Haleakala || Pan-STARRS || VER || align=right | 2.8 km || 
|-id=148 bgcolor=#d6d6d6
| 492148 ||  || — || July 28, 2013 || Haleakala || Pan-STARRS || — || align=right | 3.0 km || 
|-id=149 bgcolor=#E9E9E9
| 492149 ||  || — || February 16, 2012 || Haleakala || Pan-STARRS || — || align=right | 2.0 km || 
|-id=150 bgcolor=#fefefe
| 492150 ||  || — || February 27, 2012 || Haleakala || Pan-STARRS || — || align=right | 1.0 km || 
|-id=151 bgcolor=#d6d6d6
| 492151 ||  || — || January 27, 2011 || Mount Lemmon || Mount Lemmon Survey || — || align=right | 2.7 km || 
|-id=152 bgcolor=#d6d6d6
| 492152 ||  || — || July 28, 2013 || Haleakala || Pan-STARRS || EOS || align=right | 1.8 km || 
|-id=153 bgcolor=#d6d6d6
| 492153 ||  || — || August 3, 2013 || Haleakala || Pan-STARRS || — || align=right | 2.3 km || 
|-id=154 bgcolor=#d6d6d6
| 492154 ||  || — || September 24, 2008 || Mount Lemmon || Mount Lemmon Survey || — || align=right | 2.4 km || 
|-id=155 bgcolor=#d6d6d6
| 492155 ||  || — || July 15, 2013 || Haleakala || Pan-STARRS || — || align=right | 3.0 km || 
|-id=156 bgcolor=#d6d6d6
| 492156 ||  || — || July 14, 2013 || Haleakala || Pan-STARRS || — || align=right | 2.8 km || 
|-id=157 bgcolor=#d6d6d6
| 492157 ||  || — || January 30, 2011 || Haleakala || Pan-STARRS || — || align=right | 3.6 km || 
|-id=158 bgcolor=#E9E9E9
| 492158 ||  || — || October 30, 2005 || Mount Lemmon || Mount Lemmon Survey || — || align=right | 1.1 km || 
|-id=159 bgcolor=#d6d6d6
| 492159 ||  || — || August 8, 2013 || Haleakala || Pan-STARRS || — || align=right | 2.2 km || 
|-id=160 bgcolor=#E9E9E9
| 492160 ||  || — || April 11, 2008 || Mount Lemmon || Mount Lemmon Survey || — || align=right | 2.1 km || 
|-id=161 bgcolor=#d6d6d6
| 492161 ||  || — || August 8, 2013 || Kitt Peak || Spacewatch || — || align=right | 2.5 km || 
|-id=162 bgcolor=#fefefe
| 492162 ||  || — || September 19, 2006 || Kitt Peak || Spacewatch || NYS || align=right data-sort-value="0.47" | 470 m || 
|-id=163 bgcolor=#d6d6d6
| 492163 ||  || — || April 15, 2012 || Haleakala || Pan-STARRS || — || align=right | 2.8 km || 
|-id=164 bgcolor=#d6d6d6
| 492164 ||  || — || February 4, 2011 || Haleakala || Pan-STARRS || — || align=right | 2.5 km || 
|-id=165 bgcolor=#d6d6d6
| 492165 ||  || — || June 20, 2013 || Haleakala || Pan-STARRS || — || align=right | 2.9 km || 
|-id=166 bgcolor=#E9E9E9
| 492166 ||  || — || April 15, 2012 || Haleakala || Pan-STARRS || — || align=right | 1.0 km || 
|-id=167 bgcolor=#d6d6d6
| 492167 ||  || — || February 4, 2011 || Haleakala || Pan-STARRS || — || align=right | 3.5 km || 
|-id=168 bgcolor=#d6d6d6
| 492168 ||  || — || August 8, 2013 || Kitt Peak || Spacewatch || THM || align=right | 2.8 km || 
|-id=169 bgcolor=#d6d6d6
| 492169 ||  || — || July 19, 2013 || Haleakala || Pan-STARRS || BRA || align=right | 1.9 km || 
|-id=170 bgcolor=#fefefe
| 492170 ||  || — || January 29, 2012 || Haleakala || Pan-STARRS || H || align=right data-sort-value="0.52" | 520 m || 
|-id=171 bgcolor=#d6d6d6
| 492171 ||  || — || July 16, 2013 || Haleakala || Pan-STARRS || — || align=right | 3.1 km || 
|-id=172 bgcolor=#fefefe
| 492172 ||  || — || October 29, 2010 || Kitt Peak || Spacewatch || V || align=right data-sort-value="0.45" | 450 m || 
|-id=173 bgcolor=#d6d6d6
| 492173 ||  || — || July 16, 2013 || Haleakala || Pan-STARRS || — || align=right | 3.4 km || 
|-id=174 bgcolor=#E9E9E9
| 492174 ||  || — || March 16, 2012 || Haleakala || Pan-STARRS || — || align=right | 3.2 km || 
|-id=175 bgcolor=#E9E9E9
| 492175 ||  || — || March 12, 2007 || Mount Lemmon || Mount Lemmon Survey || — || align=right | 2.2 km || 
|-id=176 bgcolor=#d6d6d6
| 492176 ||  || — || October 23, 2008 || Mount Lemmon || Mount Lemmon Survey || VER || align=right | 2.4 km || 
|-id=177 bgcolor=#d6d6d6
| 492177 ||  || — || May 16, 2012 || Haleakala || Pan-STARRS || — || align=right | 2.0 km || 
|-id=178 bgcolor=#d6d6d6
| 492178 ||  || — || September 28, 2008 || Mount Lemmon || Mount Lemmon Survey || — || align=right | 1.8 km || 
|-id=179 bgcolor=#FA8072
| 492179 ||  || — || March 16, 2007 || Mount Lemmon || Mount Lemmon Survey || H || align=right data-sort-value="0.52" | 520 m || 
|-id=180 bgcolor=#d6d6d6
| 492180 ||  || — || September 24, 2008 || Kitt Peak || Spacewatch || — || align=right | 2.4 km || 
|-id=181 bgcolor=#d6d6d6
| 492181 ||  || — || August 8, 2013 || Kitt Peak || Spacewatch || — || align=right | 3.5 km || 
|-id=182 bgcolor=#d6d6d6
| 492182 ||  || — || February 25, 2011 || Mount Lemmon || Mount Lemmon Survey || — || align=right | 3.2 km || 
|-id=183 bgcolor=#E9E9E9
| 492183 ||  || — || May 16, 2008 || Kitt Peak || Spacewatch || — || align=right | 2.0 km || 
|-id=184 bgcolor=#E9E9E9
| 492184 ||  || — || April 15, 2012 || Haleakala || Pan-STARRS || — || align=right | 2.9 km || 
|-id=185 bgcolor=#E9E9E9
| 492185 ||  || — || November 9, 2004 || Catalina || CSS || — || align=right | 2.8 km || 
|-id=186 bgcolor=#d6d6d6
| 492186 ||  || — || January 30, 2011 || Haleakala || Pan-STARRS || — || align=right | 2.9 km || 
|-id=187 bgcolor=#d6d6d6
| 492187 ||  || — || March 30, 2011 || Haleakala || Pan-STARRS || EOS || align=right | 1.9 km || 
|-id=188 bgcolor=#d6d6d6
| 492188 ||  || — || February 4, 2011 || Haleakala || Pan-STARRS || — || align=right | 2.7 km || 
|-id=189 bgcolor=#d6d6d6
| 492189 ||  || — || April 25, 2012 || Mount Lemmon || Mount Lemmon Survey || — || align=right | 3.1 km || 
|-id=190 bgcolor=#E9E9E9
| 492190 ||  || — || March 14, 2011 || Haleakala || Pan-STARRS || — || align=right | 3.2 km || 
|-id=191 bgcolor=#E9E9E9
| 492191 ||  || — || May 15, 2008 || Mount Lemmon || Mount Lemmon Survey || — || align=right | 2.0 km || 
|-id=192 bgcolor=#fefefe
| 492192 ||  || — || July 20, 2009 || La Sagra || OAM Obs. || NYS || align=right data-sort-value="0.75" | 750 m || 
|-id=193 bgcolor=#E9E9E9
| 492193 ||  || — || February 4, 2011 || Haleakala || Pan-STARRS || — || align=right | 3.3 km || 
|-id=194 bgcolor=#d6d6d6
| 492194 ||  || — || March 31, 2011 || Haleakala || Pan-STARRS || — || align=right | 2.9 km || 
|-id=195 bgcolor=#E9E9E9
| 492195 ||  || — || October 14, 2009 || Mount Lemmon || Mount Lemmon Survey || — || align=right data-sort-value="0.83" | 830 m || 
|-id=196 bgcolor=#E9E9E9
| 492196 ||  || — || January 30, 2011 || Haleakala || Pan-STARRS || — || align=right | 1.4 km || 
|-id=197 bgcolor=#d6d6d6
| 492197 ||  || — || May 6, 2002 || Kitt Peak || Spacewatch || KOR || align=right | 1.7 km || 
|-id=198 bgcolor=#d6d6d6
| 492198 ||  || — || May 27, 2012 || Mount Lemmon || Mount Lemmon Survey || — || align=right | 2.7 km || 
|-id=199 bgcolor=#fefefe
| 492199 ||  || — || April 15, 2012 || Haleakala || Pan-STARRS || — || align=right data-sort-value="0.94" | 940 m || 
|-id=200 bgcolor=#d6d6d6
| 492200 ||  || — || March 25, 2011 || Haleakala || Pan-STARRS || — || align=right | 3.2 km || 
|}

492201–492300 

|-bgcolor=#d6d6d6
| 492201 ||  || — || March 2, 2006 || Kitt Peak || Spacewatch || LIX || align=right | 2.9 km || 
|-id=202 bgcolor=#d6d6d6
| 492202 ||  || — || September 13, 2013 || Kitt Peak || Spacewatch || 7:4 || align=right | 3.2 km || 
|-id=203 bgcolor=#E9E9E9
| 492203 ||  || — || November 6, 2005 || Kitt Peak || Spacewatch || (5) || align=right data-sort-value="0.52" | 520 m || 
|-id=204 bgcolor=#E9E9E9
| 492204 ||  || — || March 26, 2011 || Haleakala || Pan-STARRS || — || align=right | 3.6 km || 
|-id=205 bgcolor=#fefefe
| 492205 ||  || — || September 23, 2013 || Mount Lemmon || Mount Lemmon Survey || MAS || align=right data-sort-value="0.68" | 680 m || 
|-id=206 bgcolor=#fefefe
| 492206 ||  || — || July 7, 2005 || Kitt Peak || Spacewatch || — || align=right data-sort-value="0.56" | 560 m || 
|-id=207 bgcolor=#d6d6d6
| 492207 ||  || — || September 4, 2008 || Kitt Peak || Spacewatch || — || align=right | 3.6 km || 
|-id=208 bgcolor=#E9E9E9
| 492208 ||  || — || September 13, 2004 || Socorro || LINEAR || — || align=right | 1.5 km || 
|-id=209 bgcolor=#d6d6d6
| 492209 ||  || — || May 12, 2012 || Kitt Peak || Spacewatch || Tj (2.99) || align=right | 3.4 km || 
|-id=210 bgcolor=#d6d6d6
| 492210 ||  || — || August 16, 2007 || XuYi || PMO NEO || TIR || align=right | 2.9 km || 
|-id=211 bgcolor=#E9E9E9
| 492211 ||  || — || September 15, 2013 || Haleakala || Pan-STARRS || — || align=right | 2.4 km || 
|-id=212 bgcolor=#d6d6d6
| 492212 ||  || — || February 1, 2006 || Kitt Peak || Spacewatch || — || align=right | 2.4 km || 
|-id=213 bgcolor=#E9E9E9
| 492213 ||  || — || October 23, 2009 || Mount Lemmon || Mount Lemmon Survey || — || align=right data-sort-value="0.97" | 970 m || 
|-id=214 bgcolor=#E9E9E9
| 492214 ||  || — || September 23, 2009 || Kitt Peak || Spacewatch || — || align=right data-sort-value="0.84" | 840 m || 
|-id=215 bgcolor=#d6d6d6
| 492215 ||  || — || August 8, 2007 || Siding Spring || SSS || — || align=right | 3.0 km || 
|-id=216 bgcolor=#E9E9E9
| 492216 ||  || — || September 10, 2013 || Haleakala || Pan-STARRS || — || align=right | 1.1 km || 
|-id=217 bgcolor=#d6d6d6
| 492217 ||  || — || September 15, 2013 || Haleakala || Pan-STARRS || — || align=right | 3.1 km || 
|-id=218 bgcolor=#fefefe
| 492218 ||  || — || August 20, 2009 || La Sagra || OAM Obs. || NYS || align=right data-sort-value="0.66" | 660 m || 
|-id=219 bgcolor=#d6d6d6
| 492219 ||  || — || September 10, 2013 || Haleakala || Pan-STARRS || — || align=right | 4.0 km || 
|-id=220 bgcolor=#E9E9E9
| 492220 ||  || — || October 1, 2005 || Mount Lemmon || Mount Lemmon Survey || RAF || align=right data-sort-value="0.71" | 710 m || 
|-id=221 bgcolor=#fefefe
| 492221 ||  || — || August 27, 2006 || Kitt Peak || Spacewatch || — || align=right data-sort-value="0.47" | 470 m || 
|-id=222 bgcolor=#E9E9E9
| 492222 ||  || — || January 30, 2011 || Haleakala || Pan-STARRS || — || align=right | 1.3 km || 
|-id=223 bgcolor=#d6d6d6
| 492223 ||  || — || February 19, 2010 || Mount Lemmon || Mount Lemmon Survey || — || align=right | 3.1 km || 
|-id=224 bgcolor=#fefefe
| 492224 ||  || — || January 29, 2011 || Kitt Peak || Spacewatch || MAS || align=right data-sort-value="0.68" | 680 m || 
|-id=225 bgcolor=#d6d6d6
| 492225 ||  || — || March 13, 2011 || Kitt Peak || Spacewatch || — || align=right | 3.1 km || 
|-id=226 bgcolor=#d6d6d6
| 492226 ||  || — || October 2, 2013 || Haleakala || Pan-STARRS || 7:4 || align=right | 3.8 km || 
|-id=227 bgcolor=#fefefe
| 492227 ||  || — || October 24, 2005 || Kitt Peak || Spacewatch || H || align=right data-sort-value="0.68" | 680 m || 
|-id=228 bgcolor=#d6d6d6
| 492228 ||  || — || March 27, 2011 || Mount Lemmon || Mount Lemmon Survey || — || align=right | 3.3 km || 
|-id=229 bgcolor=#E9E9E9
| 492229 ||  || — || July 23, 1999 || Socorro || LINEAR || — || align=right | 2.4 km || 
|-id=230 bgcolor=#d6d6d6
| 492230 ||  || — || August 15, 2013 || Haleakala || Pan-STARRS || — || align=right | 3.4 km || 
|-id=231 bgcolor=#E9E9E9
| 492231 ||  || — || July 29, 2008 || Kitt Peak || Spacewatch || — || align=right | 1.8 km || 
|-id=232 bgcolor=#d6d6d6
| 492232 ||  || — || September 3, 2007 || Catalina || CSS || — || align=right | 2.9 km || 
|-id=233 bgcolor=#d6d6d6
| 492233 ||  || — || October 27, 2008 || Kitt Peak || Spacewatch || — || align=right | 2.4 km || 
|-id=234 bgcolor=#E9E9E9
| 492234 ||  || — || January 31, 2006 || Mount Lemmon || Mount Lemmon Survey || — || align=right | 1.8 km || 
|-id=235 bgcolor=#fefefe
| 492235 ||  || — || November 17, 2006 || Kitt Peak || Spacewatch || — || align=right data-sort-value="0.74" | 740 m || 
|-id=236 bgcolor=#fefefe
| 492236 ||  || — || October 19, 2003 || Kitt Peak || Spacewatch || — || align=right data-sort-value="0.46" | 460 m || 
|-id=237 bgcolor=#E9E9E9
| 492237 ||  || — || October 3, 2000 || Socorro || LINEAR || — || align=right | 1.3 km || 
|-id=238 bgcolor=#E9E9E9
| 492238 ||  || — || August 27, 2008 || La Sagra || OAM Obs. || MRX || align=right | 1.1 km || 
|-id=239 bgcolor=#fefefe
| 492239 ||  || — || April 6, 2000 || Kitt Peak || Spacewatch || — || align=right data-sort-value="0.68" | 680 m || 
|-id=240 bgcolor=#fefefe
| 492240 ||  || — || December 5, 2010 || Kitt Peak || Spacewatch || — || align=right data-sort-value="0.46" | 460 m || 
|-id=241 bgcolor=#d6d6d6
| 492241 ||  || — || October 5, 2013 || Haleakala || Pan-STARRS || — || align=right | 2.9 km || 
|-id=242 bgcolor=#C2FFFF
| 492242 ||  || — || March 16, 2007 || Mount Lemmon || Mount Lemmon Survey || L5 || align=right | 11 km || 
|-id=243 bgcolor=#d6d6d6
| 492243 ||  || — || October 14, 2007 || Mount Lemmon || Mount Lemmon Survey || — || align=right | 3.6 km || 
|-id=244 bgcolor=#d6d6d6
| 492244 ||  || — || September 10, 2007 || Mount Lemmon || Mount Lemmon Survey || THM || align=right | 2.3 km || 
|-id=245 bgcolor=#d6d6d6
| 492245 ||  || — || October 22, 2008 || Kitt Peak || Spacewatch || — || align=right | 3.9 km || 
|-id=246 bgcolor=#d6d6d6
| 492246 ||  || — || April 20, 2012 || Mount Lemmon || Mount Lemmon Survey || — || align=right | 3.1 km || 
|-id=247 bgcolor=#E9E9E9
| 492247 ||  || — || September 4, 2013 || Mount Lemmon || Mount Lemmon Survey ||  || align=right | 1.8 km || 
|-id=248 bgcolor=#d6d6d6
| 492248 ||  || — || October 9, 1996 || Kitt Peak || Spacewatch || — || align=right | 2.4 km || 
|-id=249 bgcolor=#fefefe
| 492249 ||  || — || April 1, 2012 || Haleakala || Pan-STARRS || H || align=right data-sort-value="0.63" | 630 m || 
|-id=250 bgcolor=#d6d6d6
| 492250 ||  || — || October 6, 2013 || Kitt Peak || Spacewatch || — || align=right | 2.1 km || 
|-id=251 bgcolor=#E9E9E9
| 492251 ||  || — || May 12, 2012 || Haleakala || Pan-STARRS || — || align=right | 1.4 km || 
|-id=252 bgcolor=#FA8072
| 492252 ||  || — || April 18, 2007 || Kitt Peak || Spacewatch || H || align=right data-sort-value="0.60" | 600 m || 
|-id=253 bgcolor=#E9E9E9
| 492253 ||  || — || October 6, 2008 || La Sagra || OAM Obs. || — || align=right | 2.7 km || 
|-id=254 bgcolor=#fefefe
| 492254 ||  || — || February 25, 2011 || Mount Lemmon || Mount Lemmon Survey || — || align=right data-sort-value="0.60" | 600 m || 
|-id=255 bgcolor=#fefefe
| 492255 ||  || — || January 28, 2007 || Mount Lemmon || Mount Lemmon Survey || — || align=right data-sort-value="0.68" | 680 m || 
|-id=256 bgcolor=#d6d6d6
| 492256 ||  || — || October 23, 2008 || Kitt Peak || Spacewatch || — || align=right | 1.7 km || 
|-id=257 bgcolor=#fefefe
| 492257 ||  || — || September 23, 2009 || Kitt Peak || Spacewatch || MAS || align=right data-sort-value="0.65" | 650 m || 
|-id=258 bgcolor=#fefefe
| 492258 ||  || — || October 18, 2006 || Kitt Peak || Spacewatch || — || align=right data-sort-value="0.55" | 550 m || 
|-id=259 bgcolor=#fefefe
| 492259 ||  || — || January 30, 2011 || Haleakala || Pan-STARRS || — || align=right data-sort-value="0.60" | 600 m || 
|-id=260 bgcolor=#d6d6d6
| 492260 ||  || — || January 30, 2011 || Haleakala || Pan-STARRS || — || align=right | 3.4 km || 
|-id=261 bgcolor=#fefefe
| 492261 ||  || — || March 29, 2011 || Catalina || CSS || — || align=right data-sort-value="0.87" | 870 m || 
|-id=262 bgcolor=#d6d6d6
| 492262 ||  || — || October 31, 2013 || Kitt Peak || Spacewatch || — || align=right | 2.7 km || 
|-id=263 bgcolor=#fefefe
| 492263 ||  || — || November 19, 2008 || Mount Lemmon || Mount Lemmon Survey || H || align=right data-sort-value="0.66" | 660 m || 
|-id=264 bgcolor=#fefefe
| 492264 ||  || — || January 10, 2007 || Mount Lemmon || Mount Lemmon Survey || NYS || align=right data-sort-value="0.52" | 520 m || 
|-id=265 bgcolor=#E9E9E9
| 492265 ||  || — || November 9, 2004 || Catalina || CSS || — || align=right | 1.9 km || 
|-id=266 bgcolor=#fefefe
| 492266 ||  || — || October 21, 2003 || Kitt Peak || Spacewatch || critical || align=right data-sort-value="0.49" | 490 m || 
|-id=267 bgcolor=#E9E9E9
| 492267 ||  || — || October 10, 2008 || Mount Lemmon || Mount Lemmon Survey || — || align=right | 2.7 km || 
|-id=268 bgcolor=#d6d6d6
| 492268 ||  || — || July 18, 2013 || Haleakala || Pan-STARRS || LIX || align=right | 3.6 km || 
|-id=269 bgcolor=#fefefe
| 492269 ||  || — || September 14, 2009 || Catalina || CSS || — || align=right data-sort-value="0.97" | 970 m || 
|-id=270 bgcolor=#E9E9E9
| 492270 ||  || — || February 1, 2006 || Kitt Peak || Spacewatch || — || align=right | 1.5 km || 
|-id=271 bgcolor=#E9E9E9
| 492271 ||  || — || December 2, 2004 || Kitt Peak || Spacewatch || — || align=right | 1.9 km || 
|-id=272 bgcolor=#E9E9E9
| 492272 ||  || — || February 8, 2002 || Kitt Peak || Spacewatch || — || align=right data-sort-value="0.57" | 570 m || 
|-id=273 bgcolor=#fefefe
| 492273 ||  || — || September 19, 2009 || Mount Lemmon || Mount Lemmon Survey || — || align=right data-sort-value="0.71" | 710 m || 
|-id=274 bgcolor=#fefefe
| 492274 ||  || — || June 14, 2012 || Haleakala || Pan-STARRS || H || align=right data-sort-value="0.72" | 720 m || 
|-id=275 bgcolor=#fefefe
| 492275 ||  || — || November 12, 2013 || Mount Lemmon || Mount Lemmon Survey || — || align=right data-sort-value="0.53" | 530 m || 
|-id=276 bgcolor=#E9E9E9
| 492276 ||  || — || October 18, 1995 || Kitt Peak || Spacewatch || — || align=right | 1.1 km || 
|-id=277 bgcolor=#E9E9E9
| 492277 ||  || — || January 8, 2006 || Catalina || CSS || — || align=right | 1.1 km || 
|-id=278 bgcolor=#fefefe
| 492278 ||  || — || March 31, 2011 || Haleakala || Pan-STARRS || — || align=right data-sort-value="0.80" | 800 m || 
|-id=279 bgcolor=#fefefe
| 492279 ||  || — || November 22, 2008 || Kitt Peak || Spacewatch || H || align=right data-sort-value="0.78" | 780 m || 
|-id=280 bgcolor=#fefefe
| 492280 ||  || — || November 29, 2013 || Mount Lemmon || Mount Lemmon Survey || H || align=right data-sort-value="0.65" | 650 m || 
|-id=281 bgcolor=#fefefe
| 492281 ||  || — || February 4, 2011 || Haleakala || Pan-STARRS || — || align=right data-sort-value="0.62" | 620 m || 
|-id=282 bgcolor=#d6d6d6
| 492282 ||  || — || November 12, 2005 || Kitt Peak || Spacewatch || SHU3:2 || align=right | 4.0 km || 
|-id=283 bgcolor=#E9E9E9
| 492283 ||  || — || September 13, 2004 || Anderson Mesa || LONEOS || — || align=right | 1.3 km || 
|-id=284 bgcolor=#fefefe
| 492284 ||  || — || September 17, 2010 || Socorro || LINEAR || H || align=right data-sort-value="0.77" | 770 m || 
|-id=285 bgcolor=#E9E9E9
| 492285 ||  || — || November 8, 2013 || Mount Lemmon || Mount Lemmon Survey || — || align=right data-sort-value="0.89" | 890 m || 
|-id=286 bgcolor=#d6d6d6
| 492286 ||  || — || May 31, 2010 || WISE || WISE || — || align=right | 4.4 km || 
|-id=287 bgcolor=#fefefe
| 492287 ||  || — || September 9, 2004 || Siding Spring || SSS || H || align=right data-sort-value="0.95" | 950 m || 
|-id=288 bgcolor=#E9E9E9
| 492288 ||  || — || October 26, 2008 || Kitt Peak || Spacewatch || MRX || align=right data-sort-value="0.76" | 760 m || 
|-id=289 bgcolor=#E9E9E9
| 492289 ||  || — || September 21, 2000 || Kitt Peak || Spacewatch || — || align=right data-sort-value="0.76" | 760 m || 
|-id=290 bgcolor=#E9E9E9
| 492290 ||  || — || July 26, 2011 || Haleakala || Pan-STARRS || MRX || align=right | 1.1 km || 
|-id=291 bgcolor=#d6d6d6
| 492291 ||  || — || August 10, 2007 || Kitt Peak || Spacewatch || — || align=right | 1.9 km || 
|-id=292 bgcolor=#E9E9E9
| 492292 ||  || — || September 6, 2008 || Mount Lemmon || Mount Lemmon Survey || — || align=right | 1.00 km || 
|-id=293 bgcolor=#d6d6d6
| 492293 ||  || — || November 8, 2007 || Kitt Peak || Spacewatch || — || align=right | 2.2 km || 
|-id=294 bgcolor=#fefefe
| 492294 ||  || — || October 23, 2003 || Kitt Peak || Spacewatch || — || align=right data-sort-value="0.47" | 470 m || 
|-id=295 bgcolor=#d6d6d6
| 492295 ||  || — || February 19, 2009 || Kitt Peak || Spacewatch || — || align=right | 2.4 km || 
|-id=296 bgcolor=#E9E9E9
| 492296 ||  || — || May 25, 2007 || Mount Lemmon || Mount Lemmon Survey || — || align=right data-sort-value="0.89" | 890 m || 
|-id=297 bgcolor=#E9E9E9
| 492297 ||  || — || September 30, 2013 || Mount Lemmon || Mount Lemmon Survey || — || align=right | 1.1 km || 
|-id=298 bgcolor=#fefefe
| 492298 ||  || — || November 27, 2013 || Haleakala || Pan-STARRS || — || align=right data-sort-value="0.63" | 630 m || 
|-id=299 bgcolor=#E9E9E9
| 492299 ||  || — || January 31, 2006 || Catalina || CSS || — || align=right data-sort-value="0.88" | 880 m || 
|-id=300 bgcolor=#d6d6d6
| 492300 ||  || — || October 22, 2012 || Kitt Peak || Spacewatch || EOS || align=right | 1.8 km || 
|}

492301–492400 

|-bgcolor=#fefefe
| 492301 ||  || — || June 11, 2012 || Mount Lemmon || Mount Lemmon Survey || H || align=right data-sort-value="0.88" | 880 m || 
|-id=302 bgcolor=#FA8072
| 492302 ||  || — || November 13, 2007 || Catalina || CSS || H || align=right data-sort-value="0.88" | 880 m || 
|-id=303 bgcolor=#fefefe
| 492303 ||  || — || November 17, 2006 || Mount Lemmon || Mount Lemmon Survey || — || align=right data-sort-value="0.51" | 510 m || 
|-id=304 bgcolor=#fefefe
| 492304 ||  || — || December 11, 2013 || Mount Lemmon || Mount Lemmon Survey || H || align=right data-sort-value="0.68" | 680 m || 
|-id=305 bgcolor=#fefefe
| 492305 ||  || — || June 10, 2012 || Haleakala || Pan-STARRS || H || align=right data-sort-value="0.71" | 710 m || 
|-id=306 bgcolor=#E9E9E9
| 492306 ||  || — || October 19, 2003 || Kitt Peak || Spacewatch || AGN || align=right | 1.1 km || 
|-id=307 bgcolor=#fefefe
| 492307 ||  || — || April 2, 2011 || Mount Lemmon || Mount Lemmon Survey || — || align=right data-sort-value="0.73" | 730 m || 
|-id=308 bgcolor=#fefefe
| 492308 ||  || — || May 18, 2012 || Haleakala || Pan-STARRS || H || align=right data-sort-value="0.67" | 670 m || 
|-id=309 bgcolor=#d6d6d6
| 492309 ||  || — || October 7, 2007 || Catalina || CSS || — || align=right | 2.2 km || 
|-id=310 bgcolor=#d6d6d6
| 492310 ||  || — || October 22, 2012 || Haleakala || Pan-STARRS || KOR || align=right | 1.2 km || 
|-id=311 bgcolor=#E9E9E9
| 492311 ||  || — || February 18, 2010 || Kitt Peak || Spacewatch || — || align=right | 1.4 km || 
|-id=312 bgcolor=#d6d6d6
| 492312 ||  || — || July 28, 2011 || Haleakala || Pan-STARRS || EOS || align=right | 1.8 km || 
|-id=313 bgcolor=#E9E9E9
| 492313 ||  || — || January 15, 2005 || Kitt Peak || Spacewatch || — || align=right | 1.6 km || 
|-id=314 bgcolor=#d6d6d6
| 492314 ||  || — || November 13, 2007 || Kitt Peak || Spacewatch || — || align=right | 2.4 km || 
|-id=315 bgcolor=#d6d6d6
| 492315 ||  || — || March 1, 2009 || Mount Lemmon || Mount Lemmon Survey || — || align=right | 2.4 km || 
|-id=316 bgcolor=#FA8072
| 492316 ||  || — || January 7, 2014 || Mount Lemmon || Mount Lemmon Survey || H || align=right data-sort-value="0.63" | 630 m || 
|-id=317 bgcolor=#d6d6d6
| 492317 ||  || — || September 19, 2006 || Kitt Peak || Spacewatch || — || align=right | 2.6 km || 
|-id=318 bgcolor=#d6d6d6
| 492318 ||  || — || December 27, 2005 || Kitt Peak || Spacewatch || SHU3:2 || align=right | 4.5 km || 
|-id=319 bgcolor=#d6d6d6
| 492319 ||  || — || October 9, 2007 || Kitt Peak || Spacewatch || — || align=right | 2.3 km || 
|-id=320 bgcolor=#fefefe
| 492320 ||  || — || September 3, 2010 || La Sagra || OAM Obs. || H || align=right data-sort-value="0.72" | 720 m || 
|-id=321 bgcolor=#E9E9E9
| 492321 ||  || — || November 10, 2004 || Kitt Peak || Spacewatch || — || align=right | 1.2 km || 
|-id=322 bgcolor=#E9E9E9
| 492322 ||  || — || March 18, 2010 || Kitt Peak || Spacewatch || HOF || align=right | 2.2 km || 
|-id=323 bgcolor=#fefefe
| 492323 ||  || — || January 21, 2014 || Haleakala || Pan-STARRS || H || align=right data-sort-value="0.73" | 730 m || 
|-id=324 bgcolor=#fefefe
| 492324 ||  || — || February 20, 2014 || Haleakala || Pan-STARRS || H || align=right data-sort-value="0.65" | 650 m || 
|-id=325 bgcolor=#fefefe
| 492325 ||  || — || January 22, 2006 || Catalina || CSS || H || align=right data-sort-value="0.74" | 740 m || 
|-id=326 bgcolor=#fefefe
| 492326 ||  || — || January 29, 2014 || Kitt Peak || Spacewatch || H || align=right data-sort-value="0.73" | 730 m || 
|-id=327 bgcolor=#fefefe
| 492327 ||  || — || May 3, 2006 || Mount Lemmon || Mount Lemmon Survey || H || align=right data-sort-value="0.94" | 940 m || 
|-id=328 bgcolor=#fefefe
| 492328 ||  || — || September 14, 2007 || Kitt Peak || Spacewatch || H || align=right data-sort-value="0.84" | 840 m || 
|-id=329 bgcolor=#fefefe
| 492329 ||  || — || September 17, 2004 || Socorro || LINEAR || H || align=right data-sort-value="0.80" | 800 m || 
|-id=330 bgcolor=#FA8072
| 492330 ||  || — || May 18, 2012 || Haleakala || Pan-STARRS || H || align=right data-sort-value="0.55" | 550 m || 
|-id=331 bgcolor=#d6d6d6
| 492331 ||  || — || November 7, 2012 || Mount Lemmon || Mount Lemmon Survey || THM || align=right | 1.9 km || 
|-id=332 bgcolor=#d6d6d6
| 492332 ||  || — || October 18, 2007 || Kitt Peak || Spacewatch || — || align=right | 2.6 km || 
|-id=333 bgcolor=#C2FFFF
| 492333 ||  || — || September 15, 2009 || Kitt Peak || Spacewatch || L4 || align=right | 7.7 km || 
|-id=334 bgcolor=#C2FFFF
| 492334 ||  || — || September 19, 2009 || Kitt Peak || Spacewatch || L4 || align=right | 7.9 km || 
|-id=335 bgcolor=#E9E9E9
| 492335 ||  || — || February 1, 2005 || Kitt Peak || Spacewatch || — || align=right | 1.2 km || 
|-id=336 bgcolor=#C2FFFF
| 492336 ||  || — || September 26, 2009 || Kitt Peak || Spacewatch || L4 || align=right | 7.4 km || 
|-id=337 bgcolor=#fefefe
| 492337 ||  || — || August 24, 2007 || Kitt Peak || Spacewatch || H || align=right data-sort-value="0.62" | 620 m || 
|-id=338 bgcolor=#C7FF8F
| 492338 ||  || — || March 12, 2014 || Mount Lemmon || Mount Lemmon Survey || centaurcritical || align=right | 44 km || 
|-id=339 bgcolor=#fefefe
| 492339 ||  || — || March 24, 2014 || Haleakala || Pan-STARRS || H || align=right data-sort-value="0.55" | 550 m || 
|-id=340 bgcolor=#E9E9E9
| 492340 ||  || — || April 8, 2010 || WISE || WISE || ADE || align=right | 2.6 km || 
|-id=341 bgcolor=#d6d6d6
| 492341 ||  || — || February 12, 2013 || Haleakala || Pan-STARRS || — || align=right | 2.5 km || 
|-id=342 bgcolor=#fefefe
| 492342 ||  || — || August 22, 2012 || La Sagra || OAM Obs. || H || align=right data-sort-value="0.78" | 780 m || 
|-id=343 bgcolor=#fefefe
| 492343 ||  || — || October 7, 2012 || Haleakala || Pan-STARRS || H || align=right data-sort-value="0.64" | 640 m || 
|-id=344 bgcolor=#FA8072
| 492344 ||  || — || April 10, 2014 || Haleakala || Pan-STARRS || — || align=right data-sort-value="0.74" | 740 m || 
|-id=345 bgcolor=#E9E9E9
| 492345 ||  || — || December 23, 2012 || Haleakala || Pan-STARRS || RAF || align=right | 1.0 km || 
|-id=346 bgcolor=#E9E9E9
| 492346 ||  || — || September 23, 2011 || Haleakala || Pan-STARRS || — || align=right | 2.1 km || 
|-id=347 bgcolor=#fefefe
| 492347 ||  || — || March 9, 2002 || Kitt Peak || Spacewatch || — || align=right data-sort-value="0.62" | 620 m || 
|-id=348 bgcolor=#E9E9E9
| 492348 ||  || — || April 5, 2014 || Haleakala || Pan-STARRS || fast? || align=right | 1.7 km || 
|-id=349 bgcolor=#E9E9E9
| 492349 ||  || — || March 27, 2014 || Haleakala || Pan-STARRS || — || align=right | 1.7 km || 
|-id=350 bgcolor=#d6d6d6
| 492350 ||  || — || March 27, 2014 || Haleakala || Pan-STARRS || — || align=right | 2.1 km || 
|-id=351 bgcolor=#d6d6d6
| 492351 ||  || — || January 16, 2013 || Haleakala || Pan-STARRS || — || align=right | 2.1 km || 
|-id=352 bgcolor=#E9E9E9
| 492352 ||  || — || November 19, 2003 || Kitt Peak || Spacewatch || — || align=right | 1.3 km || 
|-id=353 bgcolor=#fefefe
| 492353 ||  || — || March 22, 2014 || Kitt Peak || Spacewatch || — || align=right data-sort-value="0.62" | 620 m || 
|-id=354 bgcolor=#E9E9E9
| 492354 ||  || — || September 4, 2011 || Haleakala || Pan-STARRS || — || align=right | 1.5 km || 
|-id=355 bgcolor=#E9E9E9
| 492355 ||  || — || September 26, 2011 || Haleakala || Pan-STARRS || — || align=right | 1.7 km || 
|-id=356 bgcolor=#E9E9E9
| 492356 ||  || — || September 23, 2011 || Haleakala || Pan-STARRS || — || align=right data-sort-value="0.97" | 970 m || 
|-id=357 bgcolor=#d6d6d6
| 492357 ||  || — || October 1, 2010 || Mount Lemmon || Mount Lemmon Survey || — || align=right | 2.3 km || 
|-id=358 bgcolor=#E9E9E9
| 492358 ||  || — || September 4, 2011 || Haleakala || Pan-STARRS || — || align=right data-sort-value="0.78" | 780 m || 
|-id=359 bgcolor=#E9E9E9
| 492359 ||  || — || October 25, 2011 || Haleakala || Pan-STARRS || GEF || align=right | 1.3 km || 
|-id=360 bgcolor=#d6d6d6
| 492360 ||  || — || March 25, 2014 || Kitt Peak || Spacewatch || — || align=right | 2.7 km || 
|-id=361 bgcolor=#fefefe
| 492361 ||  || — || November 25, 2012 || Kitt Peak || Spacewatch || — || align=right data-sort-value="0.74" | 740 m || 
|-id=362 bgcolor=#d6d6d6
| 492362 ||  || — || March 10, 2008 || Mount Lemmon || Mount Lemmon Survey || HYG || align=right | 2.2 km || 
|-id=363 bgcolor=#d6d6d6
| 492363 ||  || — || November 6, 2005 || Kitt Peak || Spacewatch || — || align=right | 2.3 km || 
|-id=364 bgcolor=#E9E9E9
| 492364 ||  || — || October 20, 2007 || Mount Lemmon || Mount Lemmon Survey || — || align=right | 1.5 km || 
|-id=365 bgcolor=#d6d6d6
| 492365 ||  || — || April 4, 2014 || Haleakala || Pan-STARRS || — || align=right | 2.0 km || 
|-id=366 bgcolor=#E9E9E9
| 492366 ||  || — || April 4, 2014 || Haleakala || Pan-STARRS || AGN || align=right | 1.1 km || 
|-id=367 bgcolor=#d6d6d6
| 492367 ||  || — || November 23, 2011 || Mount Lemmon || Mount Lemmon Survey || — || align=right | 2.6 km || 
|-id=368 bgcolor=#fefefe
| 492368 ||  || — || July 28, 2011 || Haleakala || Pan-STARRS || Vcritical || align=right data-sort-value="0.45" | 450 m || 
|-id=369 bgcolor=#d6d6d6
| 492369 ||  || — || March 25, 2014 || Kitt Peak || Spacewatch || EOS || align=right | 1.7 km || 
|-id=370 bgcolor=#E9E9E9
| 492370 ||  || — || December 23, 2012 || Haleakala || Pan-STARRS || — || align=right | 1.4 km || 
|-id=371 bgcolor=#E9E9E9
| 492371 ||  || — || September 26, 2011 || Haleakala || Pan-STARRS || HOF || align=right | 2.6 km || 
|-id=372 bgcolor=#E9E9E9
| 492372 ||  || — || September 26, 2011 || Haleakala || Pan-STARRS || HOF || align=right | 2.3 km || 
|-id=373 bgcolor=#fefefe
| 492373 ||  || — || March 20, 2010 || Mount Lemmon || Mount Lemmon Survey || critical || align=right data-sort-value="0.68" | 680 m || 
|-id=374 bgcolor=#C2FFFF
| 492374 ||  || — || September 26, 2008 || Kitt Peak || Spacewatch || L4 || align=right | 7.2 km || 
|-id=375 bgcolor=#d6d6d6
| 492375 ||  || — || October 26, 2011 || Haleakala || Pan-STARRS || — || align=right | 2.5 km || 
|-id=376 bgcolor=#E9E9E9
| 492376 ||  || — || February 28, 2014 || Haleakala || Pan-STARRS || — || align=right | 1.6 km || 
|-id=377 bgcolor=#E9E9E9
| 492377 ||  || — || September 23, 2011 || Haleakala || Pan-STARRS || — || align=right | 1.9 km || 
|-id=378 bgcolor=#d6d6d6
| 492378 ||  || — || September 26, 2005 || Kitt Peak || Spacewatch || EOS || align=right | 2.0 km || 
|-id=379 bgcolor=#E9E9E9
| 492379 ||  || — || July 27, 2011 || Haleakala || Pan-STARRS || — || align=right data-sort-value="0.81" | 810 m || 
|-id=380 bgcolor=#d6d6d6
| 492380 ||  || — || January 14, 2008 || Kitt Peak || Spacewatch || — || align=right | 1.8 km || 
|-id=381 bgcolor=#d6d6d6
| 492381 ||  || — || October 24, 2011 || Haleakala || Pan-STARRS || EOS || align=right | 1.9 km || 
|-id=382 bgcolor=#E9E9E9
| 492382 ||  || — || July 28, 2011 || Haleakala || Pan-STARRS || — || align=right data-sort-value="0.89" | 890 m || 
|-id=383 bgcolor=#d6d6d6
| 492383 ||  || — || April 5, 2014 || Haleakala || Pan-STARRS || — || align=right | 2.6 km || 
|-id=384 bgcolor=#E9E9E9
| 492384 ||  || — || April 5, 2014 || Haleakala || Pan-STARRS || — || align=right | 1.3 km || 
|-id=385 bgcolor=#d6d6d6
| 492385 ||  || — || April 5, 2014 || Haleakala || Pan-STARRS || — || align=right | 2.3 km || 
|-id=386 bgcolor=#E9E9E9
| 492386 ||  || — || September 23, 2011 || Haleakala || Pan-STARRS || — || align=right | 2.0 km || 
|-id=387 bgcolor=#d6d6d6
| 492387 ||  || — || February 8, 2013 || Haleakala || Pan-STARRS || EOS || align=right | 1.6 km || 
|-id=388 bgcolor=#fefefe
| 492388 ||  || — || August 4, 2011 || Siding Spring || SSS || — || align=right data-sort-value="0.71" | 710 m || 
|-id=389 bgcolor=#E9E9E9
| 492389 ||  || — || December 22, 2012 || Haleakala || Pan-STARRS || — || align=right | 2.6 km || 
|-id=390 bgcolor=#d6d6d6
| 492390 ||  || — || September 23, 2011 || Haleakala || Pan-STARRS || KOR || align=right | 1.4 km || 
|-id=391 bgcolor=#fefefe
| 492391 ||  || — || October 2, 2005 || Mount Lemmon || Mount Lemmon Survey || — || align=right data-sort-value="0.50" | 500 m || 
|-id=392 bgcolor=#fefefe
| 492392 ||  || — || September 30, 2005 || Mount Lemmon || Mount Lemmon Survey || — || align=right data-sort-value="0.51" | 510 m || 
|-id=393 bgcolor=#fefefe
| 492393 ||  || — || April 21, 2014 || Kitt Peak || Spacewatch || — || align=right data-sort-value="0.71" | 710 m || 
|-id=394 bgcolor=#fefefe
| 492394 ||  || — || October 1, 2008 || Catalina || CSS || — || align=right data-sort-value="0.59" | 590 m || 
|-id=395 bgcolor=#fefefe
| 492395 ||  || — || May 4, 2014 || Mount Lemmon || Mount Lemmon Survey || — || align=right data-sort-value="0.60" | 600 m || 
|-id=396 bgcolor=#fefefe
| 492396 ||  || — || May 3, 2014 || Mount Lemmon || Mount Lemmon Survey || — || align=right data-sort-value="0.91" | 910 m || 
|-id=397 bgcolor=#E9E9E9
| 492397 ||  || — || January 17, 2013 || Haleakala || Pan-STARRS || — || align=right | 1.9 km || 
|-id=398 bgcolor=#fefefe
| 492398 ||  || — || March 13, 2010 || Kitt Peak || Spacewatch || NYS || align=right data-sort-value="0.67" | 670 m || 
|-id=399 bgcolor=#d6d6d6
| 492399 ||  || — || October 26, 2011 || Haleakala || Pan-STARRS || — || align=right | 2.4 km || 
|-id=400 bgcolor=#d6d6d6
| 492400 ||  || — || October 26, 2011 || Haleakala || Pan-STARRS || EOS || align=right | 1.6 km || 
|}

492401–492500 

|-bgcolor=#fefefe
| 492401 ||  || — || October 29, 2008 || Mount Lemmon || Mount Lemmon Survey || — || align=right data-sort-value="0.78" | 780 m || 
|-id=402 bgcolor=#fefefe
| 492402 ||  || — || May 8, 2014 || Haleakala || Pan-STARRS || — || align=right data-sort-value="0.79" | 790 m || 
|-id=403 bgcolor=#fefefe
| 492403 ||  || — || April 30, 2014 || Haleakala || Pan-STARRS || — || align=right data-sort-value="0.71" | 710 m || 
|-id=404 bgcolor=#fefefe
| 492404 ||  || — || December 16, 2006 || Kitt Peak || Spacewatch || — || align=right data-sort-value="0.91" | 910 m || 
|-id=405 bgcolor=#d6d6d6
| 492405 ||  || — || September 17, 2006 || Kitt Peak || Spacewatch || KOR || align=right | 1.3 km || 
|-id=406 bgcolor=#fefefe
| 492406 ||  || — || October 24, 2005 || Kitt Peak || Spacewatch || — || align=right data-sort-value="0.62" | 620 m || 
|-id=407 bgcolor=#fefefe
| 492407 ||  || — || September 28, 2011 || Kitt Peak || Spacewatch || — || align=right data-sort-value="0.70" | 700 m || 
|-id=408 bgcolor=#fefefe
| 492408 ||  || — || February 23, 2007 || Mount Lemmon || Mount Lemmon Survey || — || align=right data-sort-value="0.52" | 520 m || 
|-id=409 bgcolor=#fefefe
| 492409 ||  || — || May 20, 2014 || Haleakala || Pan-STARRS || V || align=right data-sort-value="0.65" | 650 m || 
|-id=410 bgcolor=#FA8072
| 492410 ||  || — || September 30, 2005 || Mount Lemmon || Mount Lemmon Survey || — || align=right data-sort-value="0.59" | 590 m || 
|-id=411 bgcolor=#fefefe
| 492411 ||  || — || May 7, 2014 || Haleakala || Pan-STARRS || — || align=right data-sort-value="0.62" | 620 m || 
|-id=412 bgcolor=#fefefe
| 492412 ||  || — || May 7, 2014 || Haleakala || Pan-STARRS || V || align=right data-sort-value="0.48" | 480 m || 
|-id=413 bgcolor=#fefefe
| 492413 ||  || — || December 23, 2012 || Haleakala || Pan-STARRS || V || align=right data-sort-value="0.56" | 560 m || 
|-id=414 bgcolor=#fefefe
| 492414 ||  || — || September 21, 2011 || Haleakala || Pan-STARRS || — || align=right data-sort-value="0.71" | 710 m || 
|-id=415 bgcolor=#fefefe
| 492415 ||  || — || May 21, 2014 || Haleakala || Pan-STARRS || V || align=right data-sort-value="0.59" | 590 m || 
|-id=416 bgcolor=#fefefe
| 492416 ||  || — || April 25, 2007 || Kitt Peak || Spacewatch || — || align=right data-sort-value="0.71" | 710 m || 
|-id=417 bgcolor=#fefefe
| 492417 ||  || — || May 21, 2014 || Haleakala || Pan-STARRS || — || align=right data-sort-value="0.56" | 560 m || 
|-id=418 bgcolor=#fefefe
| 492418 ||  || — || September 24, 2011 || Mount Lemmon || Mount Lemmon Survey || — || align=right data-sort-value="0.65" | 650 m || 
|-id=419 bgcolor=#fefefe
| 492419 ||  || — || June 3, 2011 || Mount Lemmon || Mount Lemmon Survey || — || align=right data-sort-value="0.51" | 510 m || 
|-id=420 bgcolor=#fefefe
| 492420 ||  || — || May 4, 2014 || Mount Lemmon || Mount Lemmon Survey || — || align=right data-sort-value="0.85" | 850 m || 
|-id=421 bgcolor=#fefefe
| 492421 ||  || — || January 10, 2013 || Haleakala || Pan-STARRS || — || align=right data-sort-value="0.69" | 690 m || 
|-id=422 bgcolor=#fefefe
| 492422 ||  || — || August 18, 2007 || Anderson Mesa || LONEOS || MAS || align=right data-sort-value="0.82" | 820 m || 
|-id=423 bgcolor=#fefefe
| 492423 ||  || — || October 7, 2004 || Kitt Peak || Spacewatch || — || align=right data-sort-value="0.63" | 630 m || 
|-id=424 bgcolor=#E9E9E9
| 492424 ||  || — || May 19, 2010 || WISE || WISE || — || align=right data-sort-value="0.92" | 920 m || 
|-id=425 bgcolor=#fefefe
| 492425 ||  || — || September 23, 2011 || Haleakala || Pan-STARRS || — || align=right data-sort-value="0.53" | 530 m || 
|-id=426 bgcolor=#fefefe
| 492426 ||  || — || March 6, 2013 || Haleakala || Pan-STARRS || — || align=right | 1.2 km || 
|-id=427 bgcolor=#fefefe
| 492427 ||  || — || May 21, 2014 || Haleakala || Pan-STARRS || — || align=right data-sort-value="0.53" | 530 m || 
|-id=428 bgcolor=#fefefe
| 492428 ||  || — || February 8, 2013 || Haleakala || Pan-STARRS || — || align=right data-sort-value="0.87" | 870 m || 
|-id=429 bgcolor=#FA8072
| 492429 ||  || — || June 11, 1994 || Kitt Peak || Spacewatch || — || align=right data-sort-value="0.53" | 530 m || 
|-id=430 bgcolor=#fefefe
| 492430 ||  || — || October 6, 2007 || Kitt Peak || Spacewatch || MAS || align=right data-sort-value="0.71" | 710 m || 
|-id=431 bgcolor=#fefefe
| 492431 ||  || — || June 5, 2014 || Haleakala || Pan-STARRS || — || align=right | 1.00 km || 
|-id=432 bgcolor=#E9E9E9
| 492432 ||  || — || January 12, 2008 || Kitt Peak || Spacewatch || EUN || align=right | 1.3 km || 
|-id=433 bgcolor=#fefefe
| 492433 ||  || — || October 17, 2011 || Kitt Peak || Spacewatch || V || align=right data-sort-value="0.59" | 590 m || 
|-id=434 bgcolor=#E9E9E9
| 492434 ||  || — || June 20, 2014 || Haleakala || Pan-STARRS || — || align=right | 1.2 km || 
|-id=435 bgcolor=#fefefe
| 492435 ||  || — || April 14, 2007 || Kitt Peak || Spacewatch || — || align=right data-sort-value="0.55" | 550 m || 
|-id=436 bgcolor=#fefefe
| 492436 ||  || — || June 25, 2014 || Mount Lemmon || Mount Lemmon Survey || NYS || align=right data-sort-value="0.60" | 600 m || 
|-id=437 bgcolor=#fefefe
| 492437 ||  || — || February 9, 2013 || Haleakala || Pan-STARRS || — || align=right data-sort-value="0.69" | 690 m || 
|-id=438 bgcolor=#fefefe
| 492438 ||  || — || April 20, 2007 || Mount Lemmon || Mount Lemmon Survey || — || align=right data-sort-value="0.59" | 590 m || 
|-id=439 bgcolor=#fefefe
| 492439 ||  || — || October 16, 2007 || Mount Lemmon || Mount Lemmon Survey || — || align=right data-sort-value="0.82" | 820 m || 
|-id=440 bgcolor=#fefefe
| 492440 ||  || — || October 26, 2011 || Haleakala || Pan-STARRS || V || align=right data-sort-value="0.62" | 620 m || 
|-id=441 bgcolor=#fefefe
| 492441 ||  || — || April 24, 2007 || Kitt Peak || Spacewatch || — || align=right data-sort-value="0.61" | 610 m || 
|-id=442 bgcolor=#d6d6d6
| 492442 ||  || — || June 27, 2014 || Haleakala || Pan-STARRS || — || align=right | 2.4 km || 
|-id=443 bgcolor=#fefefe
| 492443 ||  || — || May 26, 2010 || WISE || WISE || — || align=right data-sort-value="0.64" | 640 m || 
|-id=444 bgcolor=#fefefe
| 492444 ||  || — || November 20, 2008 || Mount Lemmon || Mount Lemmon Survey || — || align=right data-sort-value="0.50" | 500 m || 
|-id=445 bgcolor=#E9E9E9
| 492445 ||  || — || February 10, 2008 || Mount Lemmon || Mount Lemmon Survey || — || align=right | 1.3 km || 
|-id=446 bgcolor=#d6d6d6
| 492446 ||  || — || November 18, 2009 || La Sagra || OAM Obs. || — || align=right | 2.6 km || 
|-id=447 bgcolor=#fefefe
| 492447 ||  || — || February 1, 2013 || Mount Lemmon || Mount Lemmon Survey || — || align=right data-sort-value="0.73" | 730 m || 
|-id=448 bgcolor=#E9E9E9
| 492448 ||  || — || May 15, 2005 || Mount Lemmon || Mount Lemmon Survey || ADE || align=right | 2.2 km || 
|-id=449 bgcolor=#fefefe
| 492449 ||  || — || September 13, 2007 || Mount Lemmon || Mount Lemmon Survey || NYS || align=right data-sort-value="0.63" | 630 m || 
|-id=450 bgcolor=#fefefe
| 492450 ||  || — || June 24, 2014 || Mount Lemmon || Mount Lemmon Survey || — || align=right data-sort-value="0.74" | 740 m || 
|-id=451 bgcolor=#fefefe
| 492451 ||  || — || April 14, 2010 || Kitt Peak || Spacewatch || — || align=right | 2.1 km || 
|-id=452 bgcolor=#d6d6d6
| 492452 ||  || — || June 27, 2014 || Haleakala || Pan-STARRS || — || align=right | 2.0 km || 
|-id=453 bgcolor=#E9E9E9
| 492453 ||  || — || June 3, 2014 || Haleakala || Pan-STARRS || — || align=right | 1.2 km || 
|-id=454 bgcolor=#fefefe
| 492454 ||  || — || May 7, 2014 || Haleakala || Pan-STARRS || — || align=right data-sort-value="0.96" | 960 m || 
|-id=455 bgcolor=#fefefe
| 492455 ||  || — || April 7, 2006 || Kitt Peak || Spacewatch || MAS || align=right data-sort-value="0.61" | 610 m || 
|-id=456 bgcolor=#fefefe
| 492456 ||  || — || January 25, 2006 || Kitt Peak || Spacewatch || — || align=right data-sort-value="0.67" | 670 m || 
|-id=457 bgcolor=#d6d6d6
| 492457 ||  || — || June 5, 2014 || Haleakala || Pan-STARRS || — || align=right | 2.3 km || 
|-id=458 bgcolor=#fefefe
| 492458 ||  || — || September 18, 2007 || Kitt Peak || Spacewatch || MAS || align=right data-sort-value="0.48" | 480 m || 
|-id=459 bgcolor=#fefefe
| 492459 ||  || — || April 14, 2010 || Kitt Peak || Spacewatch || — || align=right data-sort-value="0.53" | 530 m || 
|-id=460 bgcolor=#E9E9E9
| 492460 ||  || — || March 8, 2005 || Kitt Peak || Spacewatch || — || align=right | 1.4 km || 
|-id=461 bgcolor=#fefefe
| 492461 ||  || — || January 10, 2013 || Haleakala || Pan-STARRS || — || align=right data-sort-value="0.74" | 740 m || 
|-id=462 bgcolor=#fefefe
| 492462 ||  || — || April 11, 2010 || Mount Lemmon || Mount Lemmon Survey || — || align=right data-sort-value="0.69" | 690 m || 
|-id=463 bgcolor=#fefefe
| 492463 ||  || — || September 23, 2011 || Haleakala || Pan-STARRS || — || align=right data-sort-value="0.83" | 830 m || 
|-id=464 bgcolor=#fefefe
| 492464 ||  || — || August 4, 2011 || Siding Spring || SSS || — || align=right data-sort-value="0.67" | 670 m || 
|-id=465 bgcolor=#E9E9E9
| 492465 ||  || — || November 15, 2006 || Catalina || CSS || — || align=right | 1.6 km || 
|-id=466 bgcolor=#fefefe
| 492466 ||  || — || July 2, 2014 || Haleakala || Pan-STARRS || — || align=right data-sort-value="0.98" | 980 m || 
|-id=467 bgcolor=#E9E9E9
| 492467 ||  || — || February 20, 2009 || Kitt Peak || Spacewatch || — || align=right data-sort-value="0.77" | 770 m || 
|-id=468 bgcolor=#fefefe
| 492468 ||  || — || June 5, 2010 || WISE || WISE || — || align=right | 1.5 km || 
|-id=469 bgcolor=#fefefe
| 492469 ||  || — || July 15, 2010 || WISE || WISE || — || align=right data-sort-value="0.66" | 660 m || 
|-id=470 bgcolor=#fefefe
| 492470 ||  || — || May 9, 2010 || Mount Lemmon || Mount Lemmon Survey || — || align=right data-sort-value="0.71" | 710 m || 
|-id=471 bgcolor=#fefefe
| 492471 ||  || — || February 25, 2007 || Mount Lemmon || Mount Lemmon Survey || — || align=right data-sort-value="0.51" | 510 m || 
|-id=472 bgcolor=#fefefe
| 492472 ||  || — || October 26, 2011 || Haleakala || Pan-STARRS || — || align=right data-sort-value="0.72" | 720 m || 
|-id=473 bgcolor=#fefefe
| 492473 ||  || — || September 28, 2011 || Mount Lemmon || Mount Lemmon Survey || — || align=right data-sort-value="0.63" | 630 m || 
|-id=474 bgcolor=#E9E9E9
| 492474 ||  || — || November 3, 2010 || Mount Lemmon || Mount Lemmon Survey || — || align=right | 1.9 km || 
|-id=475 bgcolor=#E9E9E9
| 492475 ||  || — || June 12, 2010 || WISE || WISE || — || align=right | 1.7 km || 
|-id=476 bgcolor=#fefefe
| 492476 ||  || — || February 2, 2013 || Mount Lemmon || Mount Lemmon Survey || — || align=right data-sort-value="0.87" | 870 m || 
|-id=477 bgcolor=#fefefe
| 492477 ||  || — || February 8, 2010 || WISE || WISE || — || align=right | 1.7 km || 
|-id=478 bgcolor=#FFC2E0
| 492478 ||  || — || July 2, 2014 || Haleakala || Pan-STARRS || APO || align=right | 1.1 km || 
|-id=479 bgcolor=#E9E9E9
| 492479 ||  || — || October 1, 2010 || La Sagra || OAM Obs. || EUN || align=right | 1.2 km || 
|-id=480 bgcolor=#fefefe
| 492480 ||  || — || May 14, 2010 || Kitt Peak || Spacewatch || — || align=right data-sort-value="0.72" | 720 m || 
|-id=481 bgcolor=#d6d6d6
| 492481 ||  || — || December 4, 2010 || Mount Lemmon || Mount Lemmon Survey || — || align=right | 2.9 km || 
|-id=482 bgcolor=#E9E9E9
| 492482 ||  || — || April 12, 2013 || Haleakala || Pan-STARRS || — || align=right | 1.2 km || 
|-id=483 bgcolor=#E9E9E9
| 492483 ||  || — || May 5, 2013 || Haleakala || Pan-STARRS || MAR || align=right | 1.2 km || 
|-id=484 bgcolor=#fefefe
| 492484 ||  || — || April 26, 2006 || Mount Lemmon || Mount Lemmon Survey || — || align=right | 1.0 km || 
|-id=485 bgcolor=#fefefe
| 492485 ||  || — || October 26, 2011 || Haleakala || Pan-STARRS || — || align=right data-sort-value="0.71" | 710 m || 
|-id=486 bgcolor=#E9E9E9
| 492486 ||  || — || May 27, 2010 || WISE || WISE || KON || align=right | 2.5 km || 
|-id=487 bgcolor=#fefefe
| 492487 ||  || — || October 12, 2007 || Mount Lemmon || Mount Lemmon Survey || — || align=right | 1.1 km || 
|-id=488 bgcolor=#fefefe
| 492488 ||  || — || October 16, 2007 || Mount Lemmon || Mount Lemmon Survey || — || align=right data-sort-value="0.85" | 850 m || 
|-id=489 bgcolor=#E9E9E9
| 492489 ||  || — || May 8, 2005 || Kitt Peak || Spacewatch || — || align=right | 1.5 km || 
|-id=490 bgcolor=#fefefe
| 492490 ||  || — || May 6, 2006 || Kitt Peak || Spacewatch || V || align=right data-sort-value="0.57" | 570 m || 
|-id=491 bgcolor=#fefefe
| 492491 ||  || — || August 16, 2007 || XuYi || PMO NEO || — || align=right data-sort-value="0.77" | 770 m || 
|-id=492 bgcolor=#fefefe
| 492492 ||  || — || March 12, 2010 || Mount Lemmon || Mount Lemmon Survey || — || align=right data-sort-value="0.78" | 780 m || 
|-id=493 bgcolor=#E9E9E9
| 492493 ||  || — || January 19, 2012 || Kitt Peak || Spacewatch || — || align=right | 2.5 km || 
|-id=494 bgcolor=#fefefe
| 492494 ||  || — || April 19, 2006 || Kitt Peak || Spacewatch || — || align=right data-sort-value="0.71" | 710 m || 
|-id=495 bgcolor=#E9E9E9
| 492495 ||  || — || June 26, 2014 || Haleakala || Pan-STARRS || — || align=right | 1.6 km || 
|-id=496 bgcolor=#fefefe
| 492496 ||  || — || September 9, 2004 || Socorro || LINEAR || — || align=right data-sort-value="0.75" | 750 m || 
|-id=497 bgcolor=#fefefe
| 492497 ||  || — || March 25, 2006 || Kitt Peak || Spacewatch || — || align=right data-sort-value="0.65" | 650 m || 
|-id=498 bgcolor=#fefefe
| 492498 ||  || — || September 19, 2007 || Kitt Peak || Spacewatch || NYS || align=right data-sort-value="0.66" | 660 m || 
|-id=499 bgcolor=#fefefe
| 492499 ||  || — || February 15, 2010 || Kitt Peak || Spacewatch || — || align=right data-sort-value="0.61" | 610 m || 
|-id=500 bgcolor=#fefefe
| 492500 ||  || — || March 15, 2007 || Mount Lemmon || Mount Lemmon Survey || — || align=right data-sort-value="0.69" | 690 m || 
|}

492501–492600 

|-bgcolor=#fefefe
| 492501 ||  || — || June 20, 2014 || Haleakala || Pan-STARRS || V || align=right data-sort-value="0.57" | 570 m || 
|-id=502 bgcolor=#fefefe
| 492502 ||  || — || October 26, 2011 || Haleakala || Pan-STARRS || (2076) || align=right data-sort-value="0.89" | 890 m || 
|-id=503 bgcolor=#fefefe
| 492503 ||  || — || October 26, 2011 || Haleakala || Pan-STARRS || — || align=right data-sort-value="0.57" | 570 m || 
|-id=504 bgcolor=#E9E9E9
| 492504 ||  || — || December 6, 2011 || Haleakala || Pan-STARRS || (5) || align=right data-sort-value="0.74" | 740 m || 
|-id=505 bgcolor=#E9E9E9
| 492505 ||  || — || March 6, 2013 || Haleakala || Pan-STARRS || RAF || align=right data-sort-value="0.88" | 880 m || 
|-id=506 bgcolor=#fefefe
| 492506 ||  || — || March 2, 2006 || Kitt Peak || Spacewatch || MAS || align=right data-sort-value="0.54" | 540 m || 
|-id=507 bgcolor=#fefefe
| 492507 ||  || — || June 24, 2014 || Mount Lemmon || Mount Lemmon Survey || — || align=right data-sort-value="0.50" | 500 m || 
|-id=508 bgcolor=#E9E9E9
| 492508 ||  || — || July 25, 2014 || Haleakala || Pan-STARRS || — || align=right | 1.1 km || 
|-id=509 bgcolor=#fefefe
| 492509 ||  || — || March 12, 2010 || Kitt Peak || Spacewatch || — || align=right data-sort-value="0.64" | 640 m || 
|-id=510 bgcolor=#fefefe
| 492510 ||  || — || October 21, 2011 || Mount Lemmon || Mount Lemmon Survey || — || align=right data-sort-value="0.63" | 630 m || 
|-id=511 bgcolor=#E9E9E9
| 492511 ||  || — || July 3, 2014 || Haleakala || Pan-STARRS || — || align=right data-sort-value="0.94" | 940 m || 
|-id=512 bgcolor=#fefefe
| 492512 ||  || — || April 9, 2010 || Kitt Peak || Spacewatch || — || align=right | 1.1 km || 
|-id=513 bgcolor=#fefefe
| 492513 ||  || — || January 22, 2006 || Mount Lemmon || Mount Lemmon Survey || — || align=right | 1.9 km || 
|-id=514 bgcolor=#fefefe
| 492514 ||  || — || February 9, 2013 || Haleakala || Pan-STARRS || — || align=right data-sort-value="0.82" | 820 m || 
|-id=515 bgcolor=#E9E9E9
| 492515 ||  || — || December 18, 2003 || Kitt Peak || Spacewatch || — || align=right data-sort-value="0.96" | 960 m || 
|-id=516 bgcolor=#fefefe
| 492516 ||  || — || October 26, 2011 || Haleakala || Pan-STARRS || V || align=right data-sort-value="0.59" | 590 m || 
|-id=517 bgcolor=#E9E9E9
| 492517 ||  || — || July 25, 2014 || Haleakala || Pan-STARRS || — || align=right | 1.1 km || 
|-id=518 bgcolor=#E9E9E9
| 492518 ||  || — || July 3, 2014 || Haleakala || Pan-STARRS || — || align=right | 1.1 km || 
|-id=519 bgcolor=#fefefe
| 492519 ||  || — || March 16, 2010 || Kitt Peak || Spacewatch || — || align=right | 1.3 km || 
|-id=520 bgcolor=#fefefe
| 492520 ||  || — || March 6, 1999 || Kitt Peak || Spacewatch || — || align=right data-sort-value="0.53" | 530 m || 
|-id=521 bgcolor=#E9E9E9
| 492521 ||  || — || February 4, 2012 || Haleakala || Pan-STARRS || — || align=right | 1.8 km || 
|-id=522 bgcolor=#fefefe
| 492522 ||  || — || February 27, 2006 || Kitt Peak || Spacewatch || MAS || align=right data-sort-value="0.66" | 660 m || 
|-id=523 bgcolor=#fefefe
| 492523 ||  || — || March 25, 2010 || Mount Lemmon || Mount Lemmon Survey || — || align=right data-sort-value="0.56" | 560 m || 
|-id=524 bgcolor=#E9E9E9
| 492524 ||  || — || August 21, 2006 || Kitt Peak || Spacewatch || — || align=right data-sort-value="0.82" | 820 m || 
|-id=525 bgcolor=#E9E9E9
| 492525 ||  || — || July 25, 2014 || Haleakala || Pan-STARRS || — || align=right | 1.8 km || 
|-id=526 bgcolor=#fefefe
| 492526 ||  || — || September 26, 2011 || Haleakala || Pan-STARRS || — || align=right data-sort-value="0.64" | 640 m || 
|-id=527 bgcolor=#fefefe
| 492527 ||  || — || April 14, 2010 || Mount Lemmon || Mount Lemmon Survey || — || align=right data-sort-value="0.80" | 800 m || 
|-id=528 bgcolor=#E9E9E9
| 492528 ||  || — || September 18, 2006 || Kitt Peak || Spacewatch || — || align=right | 1.1 km || 
|-id=529 bgcolor=#fefefe
| 492529 ||  || — || February 14, 2013 || Kitt Peak || Spacewatch || — || align=right data-sort-value="0.88" | 880 m || 
|-id=530 bgcolor=#fefefe
| 492530 ||  || — || June 30, 2014 || Haleakala || Pan-STARRS || — || align=right data-sort-value="0.58" | 580 m || 
|-id=531 bgcolor=#fefefe
| 492531 ||  || — || September 4, 2011 || Haleakala || Pan-STARRS || — || align=right data-sort-value="0.52" | 520 m || 
|-id=532 bgcolor=#E9E9E9
| 492532 ||  || — || February 8, 2008 || Kitt Peak || Spacewatch || — || align=right | 1.3 km || 
|-id=533 bgcolor=#E9E9E9
| 492533 ||  || — || June 4, 2014 || Haleakala || Pan-STARRS || — || align=right | 1.7 km || 
|-id=534 bgcolor=#E9E9E9
| 492534 ||  || — || July 7, 2010 || WISE || WISE || — || align=right | 2.0 km || 
|-id=535 bgcolor=#E9E9E9
| 492535 ||  || — || July 26, 2014 || Haleakala || Pan-STARRS || — || align=right | 1.1 km || 
|-id=536 bgcolor=#fefefe
| 492536 ||  || — || July 4, 2014 || Haleakala || Pan-STARRS || — || align=right data-sort-value="0.76" | 760 m || 
|-id=537 bgcolor=#fefefe
| 492537 ||  || — || July 7, 2014 || Haleakala || Pan-STARRS || — || align=right data-sort-value="0.70" | 700 m || 
|-id=538 bgcolor=#E9E9E9
| 492538 ||  || — || January 19, 2012 || Mount Lemmon || Mount Lemmon Survey || — || align=right | 1.8 km || 
|-id=539 bgcolor=#d6d6d6
| 492539 ||  || — || February 28, 2012 || Haleakala || Pan-STARRS || EOS || align=right | 1.7 km || 
|-id=540 bgcolor=#E9E9E9
| 492540 ||  || — || July 7, 2014 || Haleakala || Pan-STARRS || — || align=right | 1.6 km || 
|-id=541 bgcolor=#fefefe
| 492541 ||  || — || July 26, 2014 || Haleakala || Pan-STARRS || — || align=right data-sort-value="0.80" | 800 m || 
|-id=542 bgcolor=#E9E9E9
| 492542 ||  || — || July 2, 2014 || Haleakala || Pan-STARRS || — || align=right data-sort-value="0.86" | 860 m || 
|-id=543 bgcolor=#fefefe
| 492543 ||  || — || February 17, 2013 || Kitt Peak || Spacewatch || V || align=right data-sort-value="0.60" | 600 m || 
|-id=544 bgcolor=#fefefe
| 492544 ||  || — || July 3, 2014 || Haleakala || Pan-STARRS || — || align=right data-sort-value="0.65" | 650 m || 
|-id=545 bgcolor=#d6d6d6
| 492545 ||  || — || October 8, 2004 || Kitt Peak || Spacewatch || — || align=right | 2.1 km || 
|-id=546 bgcolor=#E9E9E9
| 492546 ||  || — || July 25, 2014 || Haleakala || Pan-STARRS || — || align=right | 2.2 km || 
|-id=547 bgcolor=#fefefe
| 492547 ||  || — || September 11, 2007 || Kitt Peak || Spacewatch || — || align=right data-sort-value="0.62" | 620 m || 
|-id=548 bgcolor=#E9E9E9
| 492548 ||  || — || September 26, 2006 || Catalina || CSS || — || align=right | 1.2 km || 
|-id=549 bgcolor=#E9E9E9
| 492549 ||  || — || November 23, 2006 || Mount Lemmon || Mount Lemmon Survey || — || align=right | 2.4 km || 
|-id=550 bgcolor=#E9E9E9
| 492550 ||  || — || July 25, 2014 || Haleakala || Pan-STARRS || — || align=right | 1.2 km || 
|-id=551 bgcolor=#E9E9E9
| 492551 ||  || — || July 25, 2014 || Haleakala || Pan-STARRS || AGN || align=right | 1.0 km || 
|-id=552 bgcolor=#E9E9E9
| 492552 ||  || — || December 6, 2007 || Mount Lemmon || Mount Lemmon Survey || — || align=right data-sort-value="0.71" | 710 m || 
|-id=553 bgcolor=#E9E9E9
| 492553 ||  || — || November 19, 2007 || Mount Lemmon || Mount Lemmon Survey || — || align=right | 1.6 km || 
|-id=554 bgcolor=#fefefe
| 492554 ||  || — || October 23, 2004 || Kitt Peak || Spacewatch || — || align=right data-sort-value="0.70" | 700 m || 
|-id=555 bgcolor=#E9E9E9
| 492555 ||  || — || September 2, 2010 || Mount Lemmon || Mount Lemmon Survey || — || align=right | 1.5 km || 
|-id=556 bgcolor=#fefefe
| 492556 ||  || — || April 12, 1999 || Kitt Peak || Spacewatch || — || align=right data-sort-value="0.75" | 750 m || 
|-id=557 bgcolor=#E9E9E9
| 492557 ||  || — || January 26, 2012 || Haleakala || Pan-STARRS || — || align=right | 1.7 km || 
|-id=558 bgcolor=#E9E9E9
| 492558 ||  || — || February 7, 2008 || Kitt Peak || Spacewatch || — || align=right | 1.2 km || 
|-id=559 bgcolor=#fefefe
| 492559 ||  || — || December 6, 2007 || Mount Lemmon || Mount Lemmon Survey || — || align=right data-sort-value="0.86" | 860 m || 
|-id=560 bgcolor=#fefefe
| 492560 ||  || — || March 20, 2010 || Mount Lemmon || Mount Lemmon Survey || — || align=right data-sort-value="0.58" | 580 m || 
|-id=561 bgcolor=#E9E9E9
| 492561 ||  || — || February 13, 2008 || Kitt Peak || Spacewatch || ADE || align=right | 1.5 km || 
|-id=562 bgcolor=#E9E9E9
| 492562 ||  || — || June 8, 2010 || WISE || WISE || — || align=right | 2.3 km || 
|-id=563 bgcolor=#fefefe
| 492563 ||  || — || April 14, 2010 || Mount Lemmon || Mount Lemmon Survey || — || align=right data-sort-value="0.72" | 720 m || 
|-id=564 bgcolor=#E9E9E9
| 492564 ||  || — || January 11, 2008 || Kitt Peak || Spacewatch || — || align=right | 1.5 km || 
|-id=565 bgcolor=#fefefe
| 492565 ||  || — || June 27, 2014 || Haleakala || Pan-STARRS || MAS || align=right data-sort-value="0.45" | 450 m || 
|-id=566 bgcolor=#fefefe
| 492566 ||  || — || October 14, 2007 || Mount Lemmon || Mount Lemmon Survey || — || align=right data-sort-value="0.73" | 730 m || 
|-id=567 bgcolor=#fefefe
| 492567 ||  || — || April 19, 2006 || Kitt Peak || Spacewatch || — || align=right data-sort-value="0.68" | 680 m || 
|-id=568 bgcolor=#E9E9E9
| 492568 ||  || — || November 22, 2006 || Mount Lemmon || Mount Lemmon Survey || — || align=right | 1.5 km || 
|-id=569 bgcolor=#E9E9E9
| 492569 ||  || — || September 14, 2006 || Kitt Peak || Spacewatch || — || align=right | 1.4 km || 
|-id=570 bgcolor=#fefefe
| 492570 ||  || — || September 11, 2007 || Mount Lemmon || Mount Lemmon Survey || V || align=right data-sort-value="0.48" | 480 m || 
|-id=571 bgcolor=#fefefe
| 492571 ||  || — || June 27, 2014 || Haleakala || Pan-STARRS || — || align=right data-sort-value="0.52" | 520 m || 
|-id=572 bgcolor=#fefefe
| 492572 ||  || — || September 23, 2011 || Haleakala || Pan-STARRS || V || align=right data-sort-value="0.63" | 630 m || 
|-id=573 bgcolor=#fefefe
| 492573 ||  || — || April 4, 2010 || Kitt Peak || Spacewatch || — || align=right data-sort-value="0.66" | 660 m || 
|-id=574 bgcolor=#fefefe
| 492574 ||  || — || September 11, 2004 || Kitt Peak || Spacewatch || — || align=right data-sort-value="0.60" | 600 m || 
|-id=575 bgcolor=#fefefe
| 492575 ||  || — || October 11, 2007 || Kitt Peak || Spacewatch || NYS || align=right data-sort-value="0.46" | 460 m || 
|-id=576 bgcolor=#E9E9E9
| 492576 ||  || — || September 28, 2006 || Kitt Peak || Spacewatch || — || align=right | 1.2 km || 
|-id=577 bgcolor=#d6d6d6
| 492577 ||  || — || July 14, 2004 || Siding Spring || SSS || — || align=right | 2.4 km || 
|-id=578 bgcolor=#E9E9E9
| 492578 ||  || — || July 27, 2014 || Haleakala || Pan-STARRS || — || align=right | 1.1 km || 
|-id=579 bgcolor=#d6d6d6
| 492579 ||  || — || July 27, 2014 || Haleakala || Pan-STARRS || — || align=right | 2.2 km || 
|-id=580 bgcolor=#d6d6d6
| 492580 ||  || — || July 27, 2014 || Haleakala || Pan-STARRS || — || align=right | 2.1 km || 
|-id=581 bgcolor=#d6d6d6
| 492581 ||  || — || January 30, 2011 || Haleakala || Pan-STARRS || — || align=right | 2.7 km || 
|-id=582 bgcolor=#d6d6d6
| 492582 ||  || — || November 10, 2009 || Kitt Peak || Spacewatch || — || align=right | 3.1 km || 
|-id=583 bgcolor=#E9E9E9
| 492583 ||  || — || February 23, 2012 || Mount Lemmon || Mount Lemmon Survey || — || align=right | 1.4 km || 
|-id=584 bgcolor=#E9E9E9
| 492584 ||  || — || August 28, 2005 || Kitt Peak || Spacewatch || — || align=right | 1.8 km || 
|-id=585 bgcolor=#E9E9E9
| 492585 ||  || — || October 1, 2000 || Socorro || LINEAR || — || align=right | 2.0 km || 
|-id=586 bgcolor=#d6d6d6
| 492586 ||  || — || July 27, 2014 || Haleakala || Pan-STARRS || EOS || align=right | 1.8 km || 
|-id=587 bgcolor=#E9E9E9
| 492587 ||  || — || November 8, 2010 || Kitt Peak || Spacewatch || — || align=right | 1.3 km || 
|-id=588 bgcolor=#fefefe
| 492588 ||  || — || October 8, 2007 || Mount Lemmon || Mount Lemmon Survey || — || align=right data-sort-value="0.76" | 760 m || 
|-id=589 bgcolor=#fefefe
| 492589 ||  || — || July 27, 2014 || Haleakala || Pan-STARRS || — || align=right data-sort-value="0.72" | 720 m || 
|-id=590 bgcolor=#E9E9E9
| 492590 ||  || — || July 27, 2014 || Haleakala || Pan-STARRS || — || align=right | 1.3 km || 
|-id=591 bgcolor=#d6d6d6
| 492591 ||  || — || February 5, 2011 || Mount Lemmon || Mount Lemmon Survey || — || align=right | 2.4 km || 
|-id=592 bgcolor=#E9E9E9
| 492592 ||  || — || February 23, 2012 || Mount Lemmon || Mount Lemmon Survey || — || align=right | 2.0 km || 
|-id=593 bgcolor=#E9E9E9
| 492593 ||  || — || September 18, 2006 || Catalina || CSS || — || align=right | 1.2 km || 
|-id=594 bgcolor=#fefefe
| 492594 ||  || — || July 27, 2014 || Haleakala || Pan-STARRS || MAS || align=right data-sort-value="0.78" | 780 m || 
|-id=595 bgcolor=#d6d6d6
| 492595 ||  || — || July 27, 2014 || Haleakala || Pan-STARRS || — || align=right | 2.8 km || 
|-id=596 bgcolor=#fefefe
| 492596 ||  || — || July 27, 2014 || Haleakala || Pan-STARRS || V || align=right data-sort-value="0.61" | 610 m || 
|-id=597 bgcolor=#E9E9E9
| 492597 ||  || — || May 4, 2009 || Kitt Peak || Spacewatch || — || align=right | 1.2 km || 
|-id=598 bgcolor=#fefefe
| 492598 ||  || — || March 18, 2010 || Mount Lemmon || Mount Lemmon Survey || — || align=right data-sort-value="0.50" | 500 m || 
|-id=599 bgcolor=#fefefe
| 492599 ||  || — || September 24, 2011 || Haleakala || Pan-STARRS || — || align=right data-sort-value="0.80" | 800 m || 
|-id=600 bgcolor=#E9E9E9
| 492600 ||  || — || December 28, 2011 || Kitt Peak || Spacewatch || — || align=right | 1.3 km || 
|}

492601–492700 

|-bgcolor=#fefefe
| 492601 ||  || — || September 12, 2007 || Kitt Peak || Spacewatch || V || align=right data-sort-value="0.56" | 560 m || 
|-id=602 bgcolor=#E9E9E9
| 492602 ||  || — || April 18, 2009 || Mount Lemmon || Mount Lemmon Survey || — || align=right data-sort-value="0.88" | 880 m || 
|-id=603 bgcolor=#E9E9E9
| 492603 ||  || — || October 13, 2010 || Mount Lemmon || Mount Lemmon Survey || — || align=right | 2.1 km || 
|-id=604 bgcolor=#fefefe
| 492604 ||  || — || April 19, 2002 || Kitt Peak || Spacewatch || — || align=right data-sort-value="0.61" | 610 m || 
|-id=605 bgcolor=#fefefe
| 492605 ||  || — || June 27, 2014 || Haleakala || Pan-STARRS || — || align=right data-sort-value="0.58" | 580 m || 
|-id=606 bgcolor=#E9E9E9
| 492606 ||  || — || November 12, 2006 || Mount Lemmon || Mount Lemmon Survey || — || align=right | 1.9 km || 
|-id=607 bgcolor=#E9E9E9
| 492607 ||  || — || July 25, 2014 || Haleakala || Pan-STARRS || EUN || align=right | 1.1 km || 
|-id=608 bgcolor=#E9E9E9
| 492608 ||  || — || April 2, 2013 || Mount Lemmon || Mount Lemmon Survey || — || align=right data-sort-value="0.90" | 900 m || 
|-id=609 bgcolor=#fefefe
| 492609 ||  || — || March 13, 2013 || Haleakala || Pan-STARRS || — || align=right | 1.3 km || 
|-id=610 bgcolor=#E9E9E9
| 492610 ||  || — || July 27, 2014 || Haleakala || Pan-STARRS || — || align=right | 1.3 km || 
|-id=611 bgcolor=#E9E9E9
| 492611 ||  || — || September 23, 2005 || Kitt Peak || Spacewatch || — || align=right | 2.0 km || 
|-id=612 bgcolor=#d6d6d6
| 492612 ||  || — || November 18, 2003 || Kitt Peak || Spacewatch || — || align=right | 3.0 km || 
|-id=613 bgcolor=#fefefe
| 492613 ||  || — || August 2, 2010 || Socorro || LINEAR || — || align=right data-sort-value="0.83" | 830 m || 
|-id=614 bgcolor=#d6d6d6
| 492614 ||  || — || March 29, 2012 || Mount Lemmon || Mount Lemmon Survey || — || align=right | 3.1 km || 
|-id=615 bgcolor=#E9E9E9
| 492615 ||  || — || February 21, 2012 || Kitt Peak || Spacewatch || — || align=right | 1.6 km || 
|-id=616 bgcolor=#fefefe
| 492616 ||  || — || August 7, 2010 || La Sagra || OAM Obs. || — || align=right data-sort-value="0.85" | 850 m || 
|-id=617 bgcolor=#fefefe
| 492617 ||  || — || October 21, 2001 || Kitt Peak || Spacewatch || — || align=right data-sort-value="0.60" | 600 m || 
|-id=618 bgcolor=#fefefe
| 492618 ||  || — || January 19, 2013 || Kitt Peak || Spacewatch || — || align=right data-sort-value="0.65" | 650 m || 
|-id=619 bgcolor=#fefefe
| 492619 ||  || — || April 20, 2007 || Kitt Peak || Spacewatch || — || align=right data-sort-value="0.60" | 600 m || 
|-id=620 bgcolor=#E9E9E9
| 492620 ||  || — || November 27, 2006 || Kitt Peak || Spacewatch || — || align=right | 1.8 km || 
|-id=621 bgcolor=#fefefe
| 492621 ||  || — || September 12, 2007 || Mount Lemmon || Mount Lemmon Survey || — || align=right data-sort-value="0.82" | 820 m || 
|-id=622 bgcolor=#fefefe
| 492622 ||  || — || September 7, 2011 || Kitt Peak || Spacewatch || — || align=right data-sort-value="0.74" | 740 m || 
|-id=623 bgcolor=#fefefe
| 492623 ||  || — || March 18, 2010 || Kitt Peak || Spacewatch || V || align=right data-sort-value="0.51" | 510 m || 
|-id=624 bgcolor=#fefefe
| 492624 ||  || — || February 14, 2013 || Haleakala || Pan-STARRS || — || align=right data-sort-value="0.71" | 710 m || 
|-id=625 bgcolor=#fefefe
| 492625 ||  || — || October 22, 2011 || Mount Lemmon || Mount Lemmon Survey || V || align=right data-sort-value="0.80" | 800 m || 
|-id=626 bgcolor=#fefefe
| 492626 ||  || — || October 19, 2011 || Kitt Peak || Spacewatch || V || align=right data-sort-value="0.66" | 660 m || 
|-id=627 bgcolor=#d6d6d6
| 492627 ||  || — || March 16, 2012 || Haleakala || Pan-STARRS || — || align=right | 3.1 km || 
|-id=628 bgcolor=#fefefe
| 492628 ||  || — || November 19, 2008 || Mount Lemmon || Mount Lemmon Survey || — || align=right data-sort-value="0.88" | 880 m || 
|-id=629 bgcolor=#E9E9E9
| 492629 ||  || — || August 29, 2006 || Catalina || CSS || — || align=right data-sort-value="0.90" | 900 m || 
|-id=630 bgcolor=#fefefe
| 492630 ||  || — || March 8, 2013 || Haleakala || Pan-STARRS || NYS || align=right data-sort-value="0.67" | 670 m || 
|-id=631 bgcolor=#fefefe
| 492631 ||  || — || November 2, 2007 || Kitt Peak || Spacewatch || NYS || align=right data-sort-value="0.59" | 590 m || 
|-id=632 bgcolor=#fefefe
| 492632 ||  || — || August 10, 2007 || Kitt Peak || Spacewatch || — || align=right data-sort-value="0.69" | 690 m || 
|-id=633 bgcolor=#fefefe
| 492633 ||  || — || April 18, 2007 || Mount Lemmon || Mount Lemmon Survey || — || align=right data-sort-value="0.50" | 500 m || 
|-id=634 bgcolor=#E9E9E9
| 492634 ||  || — || June 1, 2009 || Mount Lemmon || Mount Lemmon Survey || — || align=right | 1.9 km || 
|-id=635 bgcolor=#fefefe
| 492635 ||  || — || July 28, 2014 || Haleakala || Pan-STARRS || V || align=right data-sort-value="0.63" | 630 m || 
|-id=636 bgcolor=#fefefe
| 492636 ||  || — || September 11, 2007 || Mount Lemmon || Mount Lemmon Survey || NYS || align=right data-sort-value="0.46" | 460 m || 
|-id=637 bgcolor=#fefefe
| 492637 ||  || — || October 10, 2007 || Mount Lemmon || Mount Lemmon Survey || NYS || align=right data-sort-value="0.64" | 640 m || 
|-id=638 bgcolor=#fefefe
| 492638 ||  || — || October 25, 2011 || Haleakala || Pan-STARRS || — || align=right data-sort-value="0.83" | 830 m || 
|-id=639 bgcolor=#d6d6d6
| 492639 ||  || — || September 21, 2009 || Catalina || CSS || — || align=right | 3.2 km || 
|-id=640 bgcolor=#E9E9E9
| 492640 ||  || — || September 23, 2006 || Kitt Peak || Spacewatch || — || align=right data-sort-value="0.94" | 940 m || 
|-id=641 bgcolor=#E9E9E9
| 492641 ||  || — || June 28, 2014 || Kitt Peak || Spacewatch || — || align=right | 1.2 km || 
|-id=642 bgcolor=#fefefe
| 492642 ||  || — || March 16, 2007 || Mount Lemmon || Mount Lemmon Survey || — || align=right data-sort-value="0.62" | 620 m || 
|-id=643 bgcolor=#fefefe
| 492643 ||  || — || October 20, 2011 || Mount Lemmon || Mount Lemmon Survey || — || align=right data-sort-value="0.68" | 680 m || 
|-id=644 bgcolor=#E9E9E9
| 492644 ||  || — || June 29, 2014 || Haleakala || Pan-STARRS || — || align=right | 2.0 km || 
|-id=645 bgcolor=#E9E9E9
| 492645 ||  || — || June 2, 2014 || Mount Lemmon || Mount Lemmon Survey || (5) || align=right data-sort-value="0.81" | 810 m || 
|-id=646 bgcolor=#d6d6d6
| 492646 ||  || — || March 5, 2010 || WISE || WISE || Tj (2.99) || align=right | 4.3 km || 
|-id=647 bgcolor=#E9E9E9
| 492647 ||  || — || November 1, 2010 || Mount Lemmon || Mount Lemmon Survey || — || align=right | 2.3 km || 
|-id=648 bgcolor=#fefefe
| 492648 ||  || — || October 11, 2007 || Kitt Peak || Spacewatch || MAS || align=right data-sort-value="0.68" | 680 m || 
|-id=649 bgcolor=#fefefe
| 492649 ||  || — || April 11, 2003 || Kitt Peak || Spacewatch || — || align=right data-sort-value="0.85" | 850 m || 
|-id=650 bgcolor=#fefefe
| 492650 ||  || — || October 2, 2003 || Kitt Peak || Spacewatch || NYS || align=right data-sort-value="0.53" | 530 m || 
|-id=651 bgcolor=#fefefe
| 492651 ||  || — || October 10, 2007 || Kitt Peak || Spacewatch || — || align=right data-sort-value="0.79" | 790 m || 
|-id=652 bgcolor=#fefefe
| 492652 ||  || — || February 8, 2013 || Kitt Peak || Spacewatch || — || align=right data-sort-value="0.78" | 780 m || 
|-id=653 bgcolor=#fefefe
| 492653 ||  || — || September 13, 2007 || Mount Lemmon || Mount Lemmon Survey || — || align=right data-sort-value="0.62" | 620 m || 
|-id=654 bgcolor=#fefefe
| 492654 ||  || — || February 17, 2010 || Kitt Peak || Spacewatch || — || align=right data-sort-value="0.55" | 550 m || 
|-id=655 bgcolor=#fefefe
| 492655 ||  || — || March 12, 2010 || Kitt Peak || Spacewatch || — || align=right data-sort-value="0.75" | 750 m || 
|-id=656 bgcolor=#fefefe
| 492656 ||  || — || June 28, 2014 || Haleakala || Pan-STARRS || — || align=right data-sort-value="0.81" | 810 m || 
|-id=657 bgcolor=#E9E9E9
| 492657 ||  || — || April 11, 2013 || Kitt Peak || Spacewatch || — || align=right | 2.4 km || 
|-id=658 bgcolor=#fefefe
| 492658 ||  || — || May 31, 2006 || Mount Lemmon || Mount Lemmon Survey || NYS || align=right data-sort-value="0.66" | 660 m || 
|-id=659 bgcolor=#d6d6d6
| 492659 ||  || — || July 29, 2008 || Mount Lemmon || Mount Lemmon Survey || Tj (2.97) || align=right | 3.7 km || 
|-id=660 bgcolor=#E9E9E9
| 492660 ||  || — || January 26, 2012 || Haleakala || Pan-STARRS || — || align=right | 1.7 km || 
|-id=661 bgcolor=#fefefe
| 492661 ||  || — || July 3, 2014 || Haleakala || Pan-STARRS || — || align=right data-sort-value="0.63" | 630 m || 
|-id=662 bgcolor=#E9E9E9
| 492662 ||  || — || June 5, 2014 || Haleakala || Pan-STARRS || — || align=right data-sort-value="0.98" | 980 m || 
|-id=663 bgcolor=#fefefe
| 492663 ||  || — || January 17, 2013 || Haleakala || Pan-STARRS || BAP || align=right data-sort-value="0.87" | 870 m || 
|-id=664 bgcolor=#fefefe
| 492664 ||  || — || July 28, 2014 || Haleakala || Pan-STARRS || V || align=right data-sort-value="0.48" | 480 m || 
|-id=665 bgcolor=#fefefe
| 492665 ||  || — || April 18, 2009 || Mount Lemmon || Mount Lemmon Survey || — || align=right data-sort-value="0.82" | 820 m || 
|-id=666 bgcolor=#fefefe
| 492666 ||  || — || March 23, 2006 || Kitt Peak || Spacewatch || MAS || align=right data-sort-value="0.68" | 680 m || 
|-id=667 bgcolor=#fefefe
| 492667 ||  || — || February 14, 2013 || Mount Lemmon || Mount Lemmon Survey || — || align=right data-sort-value="0.68" | 680 m || 
|-id=668 bgcolor=#fefefe
| 492668 ||  || — || March 18, 2010 || Mount Lemmon || Mount Lemmon Survey || — || align=right data-sort-value="0.59" | 590 m || 
|-id=669 bgcolor=#d6d6d6
| 492669 ||  || — || November 29, 2005 || Kitt Peak || Spacewatch || KOR || align=right | 1.1 km || 
|-id=670 bgcolor=#fefefe
| 492670 ||  || — || April 26, 2006 || Kitt Peak || Spacewatch || MAS || align=right data-sort-value="0.63" | 630 m || 
|-id=671 bgcolor=#E9E9E9
| 492671 ||  || — || September 2, 2010 || Mount Lemmon || Mount Lemmon Survey || EUN || align=right | 1.00 km || 
|-id=672 bgcolor=#fefefe
| 492672 ||  || — || February 9, 2005 || Mount Lemmon || Mount Lemmon Survey || — || align=right data-sort-value="0.94" | 940 m || 
|-id=673 bgcolor=#E9E9E9
| 492673 ||  || — || February 3, 2012 || Haleakala || Pan-STARRS || — || align=right | 1.5 km || 
|-id=674 bgcolor=#fefefe
| 492674 ||  || — || November 5, 2007 || Kitt Peak || Spacewatch || — || align=right data-sort-value="0.64" | 640 m || 
|-id=675 bgcolor=#fefefe
| 492675 ||  || — || February 5, 2013 || Mount Lemmon || Mount Lemmon Survey || — || align=right data-sort-value="0.81" | 810 m || 
|-id=676 bgcolor=#d6d6d6
| 492676 ||  || — || March 24, 2012 || Mount Lemmon || Mount Lemmon Survey || — || align=right | 2.5 km || 
|-id=677 bgcolor=#d6d6d6
| 492677 ||  || — || February 28, 2012 || Haleakala || Pan-STARRS || — || align=right | 2.2 km || 
|-id=678 bgcolor=#fefefe
| 492678 ||  || — || September 28, 2003 || Kitt Peak || Spacewatch || — || align=right data-sort-value="0.68" | 680 m || 
|-id=679 bgcolor=#d6d6d6
| 492679 ||  || — || August 3, 2014 || Haleakala || Pan-STARRS || — || align=right | 2.2 km || 
|-id=680 bgcolor=#fefefe
| 492680 ||  || — || March 24, 2006 || Mount Lemmon || Mount Lemmon Survey || MAS || align=right data-sort-value="0.52" | 520 m || 
|-id=681 bgcolor=#E9E9E9
| 492681 ||  || — || January 18, 2012 || Mount Lemmon || Mount Lemmon Survey || — || align=right | 1.4 km || 
|-id=682 bgcolor=#fefefe
| 492682 ||  || — || May 23, 2003 || Kitt Peak || Spacewatch || — || align=right | 1.4 km || 
|-id=683 bgcolor=#E9E9E9
| 492683 ||  || — || April 20, 2009 || Kitt Peak || Spacewatch || — || align=right | 1.3 km || 
|-id=684 bgcolor=#E9E9E9
| 492684 ||  || — || August 3, 2014 || Haleakala || Pan-STARRS || — || align=right | 1.2 km || 
|-id=685 bgcolor=#fefefe
| 492685 ||  || — || October 26, 2011 || Haleakala || Pan-STARRS || — || align=right data-sort-value="0.65" | 650 m || 
|-id=686 bgcolor=#d6d6d6
| 492686 ||  || — || January 17, 2005 || Kitt Peak || Spacewatch || — || align=right | 2.8 km || 
|-id=687 bgcolor=#fefefe
| 492687 ||  || — || March 26, 2006 || Mount Lemmon || Mount Lemmon Survey || — || align=right data-sort-value="0.71" | 710 m || 
|-id=688 bgcolor=#E9E9E9
| 492688 ||  || — || March 18, 2009 || Kitt Peak || Spacewatch || — || align=right | 1.8 km || 
|-id=689 bgcolor=#E9E9E9
| 492689 ||  || — || February 28, 2008 || Mount Lemmon || Mount Lemmon Survey || — || align=right | 1.3 km || 
|-id=690 bgcolor=#E9E9E9
| 492690 ||  || — || January 11, 2008 || Mount Lemmon || Mount Lemmon Survey || — || align=right | 1.4 km || 
|-id=691 bgcolor=#E9E9E9
| 492691 ||  || — || June 10, 2005 || Kitt Peak || Spacewatch || EUN || align=right data-sort-value="0.98" | 980 m || 
|-id=692 bgcolor=#E9E9E9
| 492692 ||  || — || August 8, 2010 || WISE || WISE || — || align=right | 1.8 km || 
|-id=693 bgcolor=#fefefe
| 492693 ||  || — || August 2, 2010 || Socorro || LINEAR || — || align=right data-sort-value="0.90" | 900 m || 
|-id=694 bgcolor=#d6d6d6
| 492694 ||  || — || February 13, 2010 || WISE || WISE || — || align=right | 4.1 km || 
|-id=695 bgcolor=#fefefe
| 492695 ||  || — || March 2, 2009 || Kitt Peak || Spacewatch || — || align=right | 1.0 km || 
|-id=696 bgcolor=#fefefe
| 492696 ||  || — || June 24, 2014 || Haleakala || Pan-STARRS || — || align=right | 1.3 km || 
|-id=697 bgcolor=#fefefe
| 492697 ||  || — || October 19, 2011 || Mount Lemmon || Mount Lemmon Survey || — || align=right data-sort-value="0.68" | 680 m || 
|-id=698 bgcolor=#fefefe
| 492698 ||  || — || April 17, 2010 || Kitt Peak || Spacewatch || — || align=right data-sort-value="0.63" | 630 m || 
|-id=699 bgcolor=#fefefe
| 492699 ||  || — || October 18, 2011 || Mount Lemmon || Mount Lemmon Survey || — || align=right data-sort-value="0.61" | 610 m || 
|-id=700 bgcolor=#fefefe
| 492700 ||  || — || November 17, 2011 || Kitt Peak || Spacewatch || — || align=right data-sort-value="0.60" | 600 m || 
|}

492701–492800 

|-bgcolor=#fefefe
| 492701 ||  || — || September 19, 1995 || Kitt Peak || Spacewatch || NYS || align=right data-sort-value="0.69" | 690 m || 
|-id=702 bgcolor=#E9E9E9
| 492702 ||  || — || October 17, 2010 || Mount Lemmon || Mount Lemmon Survey || — || align=right | 2.1 km || 
|-id=703 bgcolor=#fefefe
| 492703 ||  || — || November 2, 1999 || Kitt Peak || Spacewatch || NYS || align=right data-sort-value="0.61" | 610 m || 
|-id=704 bgcolor=#fefefe
| 492704 ||  || — || February 16, 2013 || Mount Lemmon || Mount Lemmon Survey || NYS || align=right data-sort-value="0.57" | 570 m || 
|-id=705 bgcolor=#E9E9E9
| 492705 ||  || — || March 5, 2013 || Haleakala || Pan-STARRS || — || align=right | 1.7 km || 
|-id=706 bgcolor=#E9E9E9
| 492706 ||  || — || January 21, 2012 || Haleakala || Pan-STARRS || — || align=right | 1.8 km || 
|-id=707 bgcolor=#fefefe
| 492707 ||  || — || October 21, 2003 || Kitt Peak || Spacewatch || — || align=right data-sort-value="0.82" | 820 m || 
|-id=708 bgcolor=#fefefe
| 492708 ||  || — || October 17, 2003 || Kitt Peak || Spacewatch || — || align=right data-sort-value="0.75" | 750 m || 
|-id=709 bgcolor=#E9E9E9
| 492709 ||  || — || January 11, 2008 || Mount Lemmon || Mount Lemmon Survey || — || align=right | 1.5 km || 
|-id=710 bgcolor=#d6d6d6
| 492710 ||  || — || January 17, 2010 || WISE || WISE || — || align=right | 2.5 km || 
|-id=711 bgcolor=#E9E9E9
| 492711 ||  || — || January 19, 2012 || Haleakala || Pan-STARRS || — || align=right | 2.3 km || 
|-id=712 bgcolor=#fefefe
| 492712 ||  || — || August 6, 2014 || Haleakala || Pan-STARRS || — || align=right data-sort-value="0.73" | 730 m || 
|-id=713 bgcolor=#E9E9E9
| 492713 ||  || — || February 3, 2012 || Haleakala || Pan-STARRS || PAD || align=right | 1.6 km || 
|-id=714 bgcolor=#fefefe
| 492714 ||  || — || November 19, 2011 || Mount Lemmon || Mount Lemmon Survey || V || align=right data-sort-value="0.62" | 620 m || 
|-id=715 bgcolor=#fefefe
| 492715 ||  || — || November 30, 2003 || Kitt Peak || Spacewatch || — || align=right data-sort-value="0.90" | 900 m || 
|-id=716 bgcolor=#E9E9E9
| 492716 ||  || — || September 16, 2010 || Catalina || CSS || — || align=right | 1.9 km || 
|-id=717 bgcolor=#E9E9E9
| 492717 ||  || — || August 29, 2005 || Kitt Peak || Spacewatch || — || align=right | 1.8 km || 
|-id=718 bgcolor=#d6d6d6
| 492718 ||  || — || March 16, 2012 || Mount Lemmon || Mount Lemmon Survey || EOS || align=right | 1.8 km || 
|-id=719 bgcolor=#E9E9E9
| 492719 ||  || — || June 29, 2014 || Haleakala || Pan-STARRS || (5) || align=right data-sort-value="0.71" | 710 m || 
|-id=720 bgcolor=#E9E9E9
| 492720 ||  || — || September 4, 2010 || Mount Lemmon || Mount Lemmon Survey || — || align=right | 1.4 km || 
|-id=721 bgcolor=#E9E9E9
| 492721 ||  || — || January 20, 2012 || Mount Lemmon || Mount Lemmon Survey || — || align=right | 1.7 km || 
|-id=722 bgcolor=#fefefe
| 492722 ||  || — || March 18, 2010 || Kitt Peak || Spacewatch || — || align=right data-sort-value="0.69" | 690 m || 
|-id=723 bgcolor=#fefefe
| 492723 ||  || — || April 14, 2010 || Catalina || CSS || — || align=right data-sort-value="0.70" | 700 m || 
|-id=724 bgcolor=#fefefe
| 492724 ||  || — || January 20, 2013 || Kitt Peak || Spacewatch || — || align=right data-sort-value="0.90" | 900 m || 
|-id=725 bgcolor=#E9E9E9
| 492725 ||  || — || March 15, 2008 || Mount Lemmon || Mount Lemmon Survey || PAD || align=right | 1.4 km || 
|-id=726 bgcolor=#E9E9E9
| 492726 ||  || — || January 1, 2012 || Mount Lemmon || Mount Lemmon Survey || — || align=right | 1.8 km || 
|-id=727 bgcolor=#d6d6d6
| 492727 ||  || — || January 26, 2006 || Kitt Peak || Spacewatch || — || align=right | 2.9 km || 
|-id=728 bgcolor=#E9E9E9
| 492728 ||  || — || November 3, 2010 || Mount Lemmon || Mount Lemmon Survey || AST || align=right | 1.3 km || 
|-id=729 bgcolor=#fefefe
| 492729 ||  || — || February 9, 2013 || Haleakala || Pan-STARRS || — || align=right data-sort-value="0.73" | 730 m || 
|-id=730 bgcolor=#fefefe
| 492730 ||  || — || September 18, 2003 || Kitt Peak || Spacewatch || — || align=right data-sort-value="0.66" | 660 m || 
|-id=731 bgcolor=#d6d6d6
| 492731 ||  || — || August 3, 2014 || Haleakala || Pan-STARRS || — || align=right | 2.6 km || 
|-id=732 bgcolor=#E9E9E9
| 492732 ||  || — || February 13, 2012 || Haleakala || Pan-STARRS || — || align=right | 2.2 km || 
|-id=733 bgcolor=#fefefe
| 492733 ||  || — || April 7, 2003 || Kitt Peak || Spacewatch || — || align=right data-sort-value="0.50" | 500 m || 
|-id=734 bgcolor=#d6d6d6
| 492734 ||  || — || October 24, 1995 || Kitt Peak || Spacewatch || KOR || align=right | 1.0 km || 
|-id=735 bgcolor=#E9E9E9
| 492735 ||  || — || March 9, 2008 || Kitt Peak || Spacewatch || NEM || align=right | 1.9 km || 
|-id=736 bgcolor=#fefefe
| 492736 ||  || — || March 3, 2006 || Mount Lemmon || Mount Lemmon Survey || — || align=right data-sort-value="0.76" | 760 m || 
|-id=737 bgcolor=#fefefe
| 492737 ||  || — || August 11, 2007 || Anderson Mesa || LONEOS || — || align=right data-sort-value="0.61" | 610 m || 
|-id=738 bgcolor=#d6d6d6
| 492738 ||  || — || September 18, 2009 || Kitt Peak || Spacewatch || — || align=right | 2.1 km || 
|-id=739 bgcolor=#d6d6d6
| 492739 ||  || — || March 16, 2012 || Mount Lemmon || Mount Lemmon Survey || — || align=right | 2.0 km || 
|-id=740 bgcolor=#d6d6d6
| 492740 ||  || — || January 28, 2010 || WISE || WISE || — || align=right | 4.1 km || 
|-id=741 bgcolor=#E9E9E9
| 492741 ||  || — || September 1, 2005 || Kitt Peak || Spacewatch || — || align=right | 1.7 km || 
|-id=742 bgcolor=#d6d6d6
| 492742 ||  || — || March 24, 2012 || Mount Lemmon || Mount Lemmon Survey || — || align=right | 2.1 km || 
|-id=743 bgcolor=#E9E9E9
| 492743 ||  || — || April 19, 2004 || Kitt Peak || Spacewatch || — || align=right | 1.4 km || 
|-id=744 bgcolor=#fefefe
| 492744 ||  || — || March 31, 2013 || Mount Lemmon || Mount Lemmon Survey || — || align=right | 1.7 km || 
|-id=745 bgcolor=#E9E9E9
| 492745 ||  || — || January 19, 2004 || Kitt Peak || Spacewatch || — || align=right data-sort-value="0.85" | 850 m || 
|-id=746 bgcolor=#fefefe
| 492746 ||  || — || October 8, 2007 || Mount Lemmon || Mount Lemmon Survey || MAS || align=right data-sort-value="0.71" | 710 m || 
|-id=747 bgcolor=#fefefe
| 492747 ||  || — || October 19, 2003 || Kitt Peak || Spacewatch || — || align=right data-sort-value="0.74" | 740 m || 
|-id=748 bgcolor=#fefefe
| 492748 ||  || — || September 15, 2007 || Mount Lemmon || Mount Lemmon Survey || — || align=right data-sort-value="0.60" | 600 m || 
|-id=749 bgcolor=#d6d6d6
| 492749 ||  || — || September 19, 2009 || Kitt Peak || Spacewatch || — || align=right | 3.1 km || 
|-id=750 bgcolor=#E9E9E9
| 492750 ||  || — || February 28, 2008 || Kitt Peak || Spacewatch || PAD || align=right | 1.4 km || 
|-id=751 bgcolor=#E9E9E9
| 492751 ||  || — || June 28, 2005 || Kitt Peak || Spacewatch || — || align=right | 1.1 km || 
|-id=752 bgcolor=#E9E9E9
| 492752 ||  || — || May 27, 2014 || Haleakala || Pan-STARRS || — || align=right | 1.2 km || 
|-id=753 bgcolor=#fefefe
| 492753 ||  || — || April 5, 2014 || Haleakala || Pan-STARRS || — || align=right | 1.2 km || 
|-id=754 bgcolor=#E9E9E9
| 492754 ||  || — || October 11, 2010 || Kitt Peak || Spacewatch || — || align=right | 3.3 km || 
|-id=755 bgcolor=#d6d6d6
| 492755 ||  || — || August 5, 2008 || La Sagra || OAM Obs. || — || align=right | 5.0 km || 
|-id=756 bgcolor=#d6d6d6
| 492756 ||  || — || March 3, 2010 || WISE || WISE || — || align=right | 3.8 km || 
|-id=757 bgcolor=#E9E9E9
| 492757 ||  || — || June 14, 2005 || Kitt Peak || Spacewatch || — || align=right | 1.8 km || 
|-id=758 bgcolor=#E9E9E9
| 492758 ||  || — || April 7, 2013 || Kitt Peak || Spacewatch || — || align=right data-sort-value="0.93" | 930 m || 
|-id=759 bgcolor=#E9E9E9
| 492759 ||  || — || August 6, 2014 || Haleakala || Pan-STARRS || — || align=right | 1.3 km || 
|-id=760 bgcolor=#d6d6d6
| 492760 ||  || — || September 21, 2009 || Kitt Peak || Spacewatch || — || align=right | 2.6 km || 
|-id=761 bgcolor=#E9E9E9
| 492761 ||  || — || October 9, 2010 || Catalina || CSS || EUN || align=right | 1.1 km || 
|-id=762 bgcolor=#d6d6d6
| 492762 ||  || — || January 30, 2011 || Haleakala || Pan-STARRS || — || align=right | 2.2 km || 
|-id=763 bgcolor=#fefefe
| 492763 ||  || — || June 11, 2010 || Mount Lemmon || Mount Lemmon Survey || NYS || align=right data-sort-value="0.58" | 580 m || 
|-id=764 bgcolor=#d6d6d6
| 492764 ||  || — || February 7, 2006 || Mount Lemmon || Mount Lemmon Survey || — || align=right | 2.5 km || 
|-id=765 bgcolor=#d6d6d6
| 492765 ||  || — || February 28, 2012 || Haleakala || Pan-STARRS || — || align=right | 2.1 km || 
|-id=766 bgcolor=#fefefe
| 492766 ||  || — || April 20, 2006 || Kitt Peak || Spacewatch || — || align=right data-sort-value="0.61" | 610 m || 
|-id=767 bgcolor=#E9E9E9
| 492767 ||  || — || September 17, 2010 || Mount Lemmon || Mount Lemmon Survey || — || align=right | 1.4 km || 
|-id=768 bgcolor=#d6d6d6
| 492768 ||  || — || February 16, 2012 || Haleakala || Pan-STARRS || — || align=right | 2.3 km || 
|-id=769 bgcolor=#E9E9E9
| 492769 ||  || — || January 27, 2012 || Mount Lemmon || Mount Lemmon Survey || — || align=right | 1.4 km || 
|-id=770 bgcolor=#d6d6d6
| 492770 ||  || — || January 4, 2011 || Mount Lemmon || Mount Lemmon Survey || — || align=right | 2.6 km || 
|-id=771 bgcolor=#E9E9E9
| 492771 ||  || — || August 25, 2001 || Kitt Peak || Spacewatch || — || align=right | 1.5 km || 
|-id=772 bgcolor=#fefefe
| 492772 ||  || — || May 6, 2010 || Mount Lemmon || Mount Lemmon Survey || — || align=right data-sort-value="0.57" | 570 m || 
|-id=773 bgcolor=#d6d6d6
| 492773 ||  || — || August 22, 2014 || Haleakala || Pan-STARRS || — || align=right | 2.0 km || 
|-id=774 bgcolor=#d6d6d6
| 492774 ||  || — || November 12, 2010 || Mount Lemmon || Mount Lemmon Survey || — || align=right | 2.1 km || 
|-id=775 bgcolor=#E9E9E9
| 492775 ||  || — || September 18, 2010 || Mount Lemmon || Mount Lemmon Survey || JUN || align=right | 1.2 km || 
|-id=776 bgcolor=#d6d6d6
| 492776 ||  || — || September 23, 2009 || Mount Lemmon || Mount Lemmon Survey || — || align=right | 2.0 km || 
|-id=777 bgcolor=#E9E9E9
| 492777 ||  || — || July 1, 2010 || WISE || WISE || — || align=right | 1.3 km || 
|-id=778 bgcolor=#E9E9E9
| 492778 ||  || — || July 28, 2014 || Haleakala || Pan-STARRS || — || align=right data-sort-value="0.99" | 990 m || 
|-id=779 bgcolor=#E9E9E9
| 492779 ||  || — || September 15, 2006 || Kitt Peak || Spacewatch || — || align=right data-sort-value="0.71" | 710 m || 
|-id=780 bgcolor=#fefefe
| 492780 ||  || — || October 26, 2011 || Haleakala || Pan-STARRS || V || align=right data-sort-value="0.68" | 680 m || 
|-id=781 bgcolor=#fefefe
| 492781 ||  || — || October 12, 2007 || Mount Lemmon || Mount Lemmon Survey || — || align=right data-sort-value="0.71" | 710 m || 
|-id=782 bgcolor=#E9E9E9
| 492782 ||  || — || October 13, 2010 || Kitt Peak || Spacewatch || — || align=right | 1.1 km || 
|-id=783 bgcolor=#E9E9E9
| 492783 ||  || — || April 2, 2009 || Kitt Peak || Spacewatch || — || align=right data-sort-value="0.78" | 780 m || 
|-id=784 bgcolor=#E9E9E9
| 492784 ||  || — || August 28, 2005 || Kitt Peak || Spacewatch || — || align=right | 1.8 km || 
|-id=785 bgcolor=#fefefe
| 492785 ||  || — || October 4, 2007 || Kitt Peak || Spacewatch || MAS || align=right data-sort-value="0.68" | 680 m || 
|-id=786 bgcolor=#d6d6d6
| 492786 ||  || — || October 16, 2009 || Mount Lemmon || Mount Lemmon Survey || EOS || align=right | 1.6 km || 
|-id=787 bgcolor=#d6d6d6
| 492787 ||  || — || August 15, 2009 || Kitt Peak || Spacewatch || — || align=right | 2.5 km || 
|-id=788 bgcolor=#fefefe
| 492788 ||  || — || September 13, 2007 || Mount Lemmon || Mount Lemmon Survey || — || align=right data-sort-value="0.67" | 670 m || 
|-id=789 bgcolor=#E9E9E9
| 492789 ||  || — || March 28, 2008 || Mount Lemmon || Mount Lemmon Survey || HOF || align=right | 2.1 km || 
|-id=790 bgcolor=#d6d6d6
| 492790 ||  || — || April 20, 2012 || Mount Lemmon || Mount Lemmon Survey || — || align=right | 2.8 km || 
|-id=791 bgcolor=#d6d6d6
| 492791 ||  || — || January 30, 2006 || Kitt Peak || Spacewatch || — || align=right | 2.6 km || 
|-id=792 bgcolor=#d6d6d6
| 492792 ||  || — || August 29, 2009 || Kitt Peak || Spacewatch || — || align=right | 2.3 km || 
|-id=793 bgcolor=#d6d6d6
| 492793 ||  || — || December 4, 2010 || Mount Lemmon || Mount Lemmon Survey ||  || align=right | 2.1 km || 
|-id=794 bgcolor=#d6d6d6
| 492794 ||  || — || September 18, 2003 || Kitt Peak || Spacewatch || — || align=right | 2.8 km || 
|-id=795 bgcolor=#fefefe
| 492795 ||  || — || April 20, 2006 || Kitt Peak || Spacewatch || NYS || align=right data-sort-value="0.50" | 500 m || 
|-id=796 bgcolor=#d6d6d6
| 492796 ||  || — || March 28, 2012 || Haleakala || Pan-STARRS || — || align=right | 2.6 km || 
|-id=797 bgcolor=#E9E9E9
| 492797 ||  || — || April 3, 2008 || Kitt Peak || Spacewatch || — || align=right | 2.2 km || 
|-id=798 bgcolor=#d6d6d6
| 492798 ||  || — || January 2, 2011 || Mount Lemmon || Mount Lemmon Survey || — || align=right | 2.2 km || 
|-id=799 bgcolor=#d6d6d6
| 492799 ||  || — || September 15, 2004 || Anderson Mesa || LONEOS || — || align=right | 2.5 km || 
|-id=800 bgcolor=#E9E9E9
| 492800 ||  || — || January 26, 2012 || Haleakala || Pan-STARRS || (5) || align=right data-sort-value="0.81" | 810 m || 
|}

492801–492900 

|-bgcolor=#d6d6d6
| 492801 ||  || — || January 31, 2006 || Kitt Peak || Spacewatch || — || align=right | 2.5 km || 
|-id=802 bgcolor=#d6d6d6
| 492802 ||  || — || September 22, 2009 || Mount Lemmon || Mount Lemmon Survey || — || align=right | 2.3 km || 
|-id=803 bgcolor=#d6d6d6
| 492803 ||  || — || August 22, 2014 || Haleakala || Pan-STARRS || — || align=right | 2.9 km || 
|-id=804 bgcolor=#d6d6d6
| 492804 ||  || — || February 21, 2012 || Mount Lemmon || Mount Lemmon Survey || TRE || align=right | 2.0 km || 
|-id=805 bgcolor=#E9E9E9
| 492805 ||  || — || November 19, 2007 || Mount Lemmon || Mount Lemmon Survey || — || align=right | 1.6 km || 
|-id=806 bgcolor=#E9E9E9
| 492806 ||  || — || January 16, 2008 || Kitt Peak || Spacewatch || MAR || align=right | 1.0 km || 
|-id=807 bgcolor=#d6d6d6
| 492807 ||  || — || December 18, 2004 || Kitt Peak || Spacewatch || EOS || align=right | 1.8 km || 
|-id=808 bgcolor=#d6d6d6
| 492808 ||  || — || August 22, 2014 || Haleakala || Pan-STARRS || — || align=right | 2.5 km || 
|-id=809 bgcolor=#E9E9E9
| 492809 ||  || — || October 21, 2006 || Mount Lemmon || Mount Lemmon Survey || — || align=right | 2.6 km || 
|-id=810 bgcolor=#d6d6d6
| 492810 ||  || — || December 20, 2004 || Mount Lemmon || Mount Lemmon Survey || — || align=right | 2.7 km || 
|-id=811 bgcolor=#E9E9E9
| 492811 ||  || — || February 4, 2012 || Haleakala || Pan-STARRS || — || align=right | 1.8 km || 
|-id=812 bgcolor=#E9E9E9
| 492812 ||  || — || August 18, 2014 || Haleakala || Pan-STARRS || (5) || align=right data-sort-value="0.81" | 810 m || 
|-id=813 bgcolor=#E9E9E9
| 492813 ||  || — || September 2, 2010 || Mount Lemmon || Mount Lemmon Survey || — || align=right | 1.3 km || 
|-id=814 bgcolor=#E9E9E9
| 492814 ||  || — || November 15, 2006 || Kitt Peak || Spacewatch || — || align=right | 1.3 km || 
|-id=815 bgcolor=#d6d6d6
| 492815 ||  || — || October 4, 2007 || Catalina || CSS || Tj (2.9) || align=right | 3.5 km || 
|-id=816 bgcolor=#d6d6d6
| 492816 ||  || — || January 30, 2011 || Haleakala || Pan-STARRS || — || align=right | 3.4 km || 
|-id=817 bgcolor=#E9E9E9
| 492817 ||  || — || October 24, 2005 || Kitt Peak || Spacewatch || AGN || align=right | 1.1 km || 
|-id=818 bgcolor=#fefefe
| 492818 ||  || — || November 26, 2011 || Mount Lemmon || Mount Lemmon Survey || V || align=right data-sort-value="0.48" | 480 m || 
|-id=819 bgcolor=#E9E9E9
| 492819 ||  || — || September 10, 2010 || Mount Lemmon || Mount Lemmon Survey || — || align=right | 1.8 km || 
|-id=820 bgcolor=#E9E9E9
| 492820 ||  || — || August 29, 2005 || Kitt Peak || Spacewatch || HOF || align=right | 2.3 km || 
|-id=821 bgcolor=#d6d6d6
| 492821 ||  || — || December 8, 2010 || Kitt Peak || Spacewatch || — || align=right | 2.4 km || 
|-id=822 bgcolor=#E9E9E9
| 492822 ||  || — || August 25, 2014 || Haleakala || Pan-STARRS || — || align=right | 1.1 km || 
|-id=823 bgcolor=#d6d6d6
| 492823 ||  || — || August 25, 2014 || Haleakala || Pan-STARRS || — || align=right | 2.7 km || 
|-id=824 bgcolor=#E9E9E9
| 492824 ||  || — || December 13, 2006 || Kitt Peak || Spacewatch || — || align=right | 2.3 km || 
|-id=825 bgcolor=#E9E9E9
| 492825 ||  || — || November 26, 2011 || Mount Lemmon || Mount Lemmon Survey || — || align=right | 1.9 km || 
|-id=826 bgcolor=#d6d6d6
| 492826 ||  || — || September 29, 2009 || Mount Lemmon || Mount Lemmon Survey || EOS || align=right | 1.9 km || 
|-id=827 bgcolor=#E9E9E9
| 492827 ||  || — || February 3, 2012 || Mount Lemmon || Mount Lemmon Survey || EUN || align=right | 1.4 km || 
|-id=828 bgcolor=#d6d6d6
| 492828 ||  || — || December 2, 2010 || Mount Lemmon || Mount Lemmon Survey || — || align=right | 2.5 km || 
|-id=829 bgcolor=#E9E9E9
| 492829 ||  || — || November 7, 2010 || Mount Lemmon || Mount Lemmon Survey || AGN || align=right | 1.2 km || 
|-id=830 bgcolor=#d6d6d6
| 492830 ||  || — || February 17, 2010 || WISE || WISE || — || align=right | 3.8 km || 
|-id=831 bgcolor=#d6d6d6
| 492831 ||  || — || February 2, 2006 || Kitt Peak || Spacewatch || — || align=right | 2.4 km || 
|-id=832 bgcolor=#fefefe
| 492832 ||  || — || July 31, 2014 || Haleakala || Pan-STARRS || — || align=right data-sort-value="0.90" | 900 m || 
|-id=833 bgcolor=#fefefe
| 492833 ||  || — || July 27, 2014 || Haleakala || Pan-STARRS || NYS || align=right data-sort-value="0.61" | 610 m || 
|-id=834 bgcolor=#fefefe
| 492834 ||  || — || October 18, 2003 || Kitt Peak || Spacewatch || — || align=right data-sort-value="0.71" | 710 m || 
|-id=835 bgcolor=#E9E9E9
| 492835 ||  || — || April 5, 2003 || Kitt Peak || Spacewatch || GEF || align=right | 1.4 km || 
|-id=836 bgcolor=#fefefe
| 492836 ||  || — || April 29, 2006 || Kitt Peak || Spacewatch || — || align=right data-sort-value="0.75" | 750 m || 
|-id=837 bgcolor=#E9E9E9
| 492837 ||  || — || March 19, 2013 || Haleakala || Pan-STARRS || — || align=right data-sort-value="0.76" | 760 m || 
|-id=838 bgcolor=#d6d6d6
| 492838 ||  || — || September 18, 2009 || Kitt Peak || Spacewatch || — || align=right | 2.3 km || 
|-id=839 bgcolor=#d6d6d6
| 492839 ||  || — || September 20, 2009 || Kitt Peak || Spacewatch || — || align=right | 2.5 km || 
|-id=840 bgcolor=#E9E9E9
| 492840 ||  || — || October 13, 2010 || Mount Lemmon || Mount Lemmon Survey || — || align=right | 1.5 km || 
|-id=841 bgcolor=#E9E9E9
| 492841 ||  || — || August 25, 2014 || Haleakala || Pan-STARRS || — || align=right | 1.4 km || 
|-id=842 bgcolor=#d6d6d6
| 492842 ||  || — || August 25, 2014 || Haleakala || Pan-STARRS || — || align=right | 2.2 km || 
|-id=843 bgcolor=#E9E9E9
| 492843 ||  || — || October 27, 2005 || Anderson Mesa || LONEOS || — || align=right | 2.1 km || 
|-id=844 bgcolor=#d6d6d6
| 492844 ||  || — || October 27, 2009 || Mount Lemmon || Mount Lemmon Survey || — || align=right | 4.6 km || 
|-id=845 bgcolor=#d6d6d6
| 492845 ||  || — || October 27, 2003 || Kitt Peak || Spacewatch || — || align=right | 3.0 km || 
|-id=846 bgcolor=#d6d6d6
| 492846 ||  || — || August 25, 2014 || Haleakala || Pan-STARRS || — || align=right | 2.9 km || 
|-id=847 bgcolor=#E9E9E9
| 492847 ||  || — || February 3, 2012 || Haleakala || Pan-STARRS || — || align=right | 1.5 km || 
|-id=848 bgcolor=#d6d6d6
| 492848 ||  || — || February 15, 2010 || WISE || WISE || — || align=right | 4.3 km || 
|-id=849 bgcolor=#fefefe
| 492849 ||  || — || February 6, 2013 || Kitt Peak || Spacewatch || — || align=right data-sort-value="0.85" | 850 m || 
|-id=850 bgcolor=#E9E9E9
| 492850 ||  || — || January 19, 2012 || Haleakala || Pan-STARRS || — || align=right | 1.5 km || 
|-id=851 bgcolor=#E9E9E9
| 492851 ||  || — || February 8, 2008 || Kitt Peak || Spacewatch || — || align=right | 1.5 km || 
|-id=852 bgcolor=#E9E9E9
| 492852 ||  || — || September 2, 2010 || Mount Lemmon || Mount Lemmon Survey || — || align=right data-sort-value="0.91" | 910 m || 
|-id=853 bgcolor=#d6d6d6
| 492853 ||  || — || March 2, 2011 || Catalina || CSS || — || align=right | 3.8 km || 
|-id=854 bgcolor=#d6d6d6
| 492854 ||  || — || September 29, 2009 || Mount Lemmon || Mount Lemmon Survey || EOS || align=right | 2.0 km || 
|-id=855 bgcolor=#d6d6d6
| 492855 ||  || — || August 20, 2014 || Haleakala || Pan-STARRS || — || align=right | 2.0 km || 
|-id=856 bgcolor=#d6d6d6
| 492856 ||  || — || March 1, 2010 || WISE || WISE || — || align=right | 2.9 km || 
|-id=857 bgcolor=#d6d6d6
| 492857 ||  || — || February 25, 2007 || Mount Lemmon || Mount Lemmon Survey || KOR || align=right | 1.2 km || 
|-id=858 bgcolor=#E9E9E9
| 492858 ||  || — || May 10, 2013 || Catalina || CSS || — || align=right | 1.6 km || 
|-id=859 bgcolor=#E9E9E9
| 492859 ||  || — || August 27, 2014 || Haleakala || Pan-STARRS || — || align=right | 1.8 km || 
|-id=860 bgcolor=#d6d6d6
| 492860 ||  || — || January 30, 2011 || Mount Lemmon || Mount Lemmon Survey || EOS || align=right | 2.1 km || 
|-id=861 bgcolor=#fefefe
| 492861 ||  || — || December 18, 2007 || Mount Lemmon || Mount Lemmon Survey || — || align=right data-sort-value="0.78" | 780 m || 
|-id=862 bgcolor=#fefefe
| 492862 ||  || — || July 27, 2014 || Haleakala || Pan-STARRS || NYS || align=right data-sort-value="0.56" | 560 m || 
|-id=863 bgcolor=#E9E9E9
| 492863 ||  || — || April 11, 2013 || Mount Lemmon || Mount Lemmon Survey || — || align=right | 1.2 km || 
|-id=864 bgcolor=#E9E9E9
| 492864 ||  || — || October 9, 2005 || Kitt Peak || Spacewatch || — || align=right | 2.0 km || 
|-id=865 bgcolor=#fefefe
| 492865 ||  || — || September 11, 2007 || Kitt Peak || Spacewatch || — || align=right data-sort-value="0.79" | 790 m || 
|-id=866 bgcolor=#fefefe
| 492866 ||  || — || July 31, 2014 || Haleakala || Pan-STARRS || — || align=right data-sort-value="0.63" | 630 m || 
|-id=867 bgcolor=#fefefe
| 492867 ||  || — || January 20, 2009 || Mount Lemmon || Mount Lemmon Survey || — || align=right data-sort-value="0.85" | 850 m || 
|-id=868 bgcolor=#d6d6d6
| 492868 ||  || — || April 27, 2012 || Haleakala || Pan-STARRS || EOS || align=right | 1.8 km || 
|-id=869 bgcolor=#d6d6d6
| 492869 ||  || — || September 28, 2009 || Mount Lemmon || Mount Lemmon Survey || — || align=right | 2.0 km || 
|-id=870 bgcolor=#d6d6d6
| 492870 ||  || — || March 16, 2007 || Kitt Peak || Spacewatch || EOS || align=right | 2.0 km || 
|-id=871 bgcolor=#E9E9E9
| 492871 ||  || — || October 4, 1997 || Kitt Peak || Spacewatch || — || align=right | 1.3 km || 
|-id=872 bgcolor=#d6d6d6
| 492872 ||  || — || December 2, 2010 || Mount Lemmon || Mount Lemmon Survey || — || align=right | 2.5 km || 
|-id=873 bgcolor=#d6d6d6
| 492873 ||  || — || February 1, 2010 || WISE || WISE || — || align=right | 3.5 km || 
|-id=874 bgcolor=#E9E9E9
| 492874 ||  || — || January 1, 2012 || Mount Lemmon || Mount Lemmon Survey || — || align=right | 1.8 km || 
|-id=875 bgcolor=#E9E9E9
| 492875 ||  || — || April 13, 2013 || Haleakala || Pan-STARRS || — || align=right | 1.0 km || 
|-id=876 bgcolor=#E9E9E9
| 492876 ||  || — || August 20, 2014 || Haleakala || Pan-STARRS || — || align=right | 1.8 km || 
|-id=877 bgcolor=#fefefe
| 492877 ||  || — || October 9, 2007 || Kitt Peak || Spacewatch || — || align=right data-sort-value="0.73" | 730 m || 
|-id=878 bgcolor=#d6d6d6
| 492878 ||  || — || March 15, 2007 || Kitt Peak || Spacewatch || — || align=right | 2.4 km || 
|-id=879 bgcolor=#fefefe
| 492879 ||  || — || April 30, 2006 || Kitt Peak || Spacewatch || MAS || align=right data-sort-value="0.54" | 540 m || 
|-id=880 bgcolor=#E9E9E9
| 492880 ||  || — || August 27, 2014 || Haleakala || Pan-STARRS || — || align=right data-sort-value="0.86" | 860 m || 
|-id=881 bgcolor=#E9E9E9
| 492881 ||  || — || March 10, 2008 || Kitt Peak || Spacewatch || WIT || align=right data-sort-value="0.95" | 950 m || 
|-id=882 bgcolor=#d6d6d6
| 492882 ||  || — || September 21, 2003 || Kitt Peak || Spacewatch || — || align=right | 2.6 km || 
|-id=883 bgcolor=#E9E9E9
| 492883 ||  || — || September 11, 2010 || Mount Lemmon || Mount Lemmon Survey || — || align=right | 1.8 km || 
|-id=884 bgcolor=#E9E9E9
| 492884 ||  || — || November 12, 2010 || Mount Lemmon || Mount Lemmon Survey || — || align=right | 2.1 km || 
|-id=885 bgcolor=#d6d6d6
| 492885 ||  || — || January 21, 2012 || Kitt Peak || Spacewatch || — || align=right | 2.4 km || 
|-id=886 bgcolor=#E9E9E9
| 492886 ||  || — || September 27, 2006 || Mount Lemmon || Mount Lemmon Survey || — || align=right | 1.1 km || 
|-id=887 bgcolor=#fefefe
| 492887 ||  || — || November 4, 1999 || Kitt Peak || Spacewatch || — || align=right data-sort-value="0.91" | 910 m || 
|-id=888 bgcolor=#d6d6d6
| 492888 ||  || — || September 19, 2003 || Kitt Peak || Spacewatch || — || align=right | 2.6 km || 
|-id=889 bgcolor=#fefefe
| 492889 ||  || — || March 6, 2013 || Haleakala || Pan-STARRS || NYS || align=right data-sort-value="0.68" | 680 m || 
|-id=890 bgcolor=#d6d6d6
| 492890 ||  || — || February 8, 2002 || Kitt Peak || Spacewatch || — || align=right | 2.3 km || 
|-id=891 bgcolor=#fefefe
| 492891 ||  || — || January 30, 2006 || Kitt Peak || Spacewatch || — || align=right data-sort-value="0.60" | 600 m || 
|-id=892 bgcolor=#fefefe
| 492892 ||  || — || September 13, 2007 || Mount Lemmon || Mount Lemmon Survey || MAS || align=right data-sort-value="0.62" | 620 m || 
|-id=893 bgcolor=#fefefe
| 492893 ||  || — || April 24, 2006 || Kitt Peak || Spacewatch || V || align=right data-sort-value="0.61" | 610 m || 
|-id=894 bgcolor=#E9E9E9
| 492894 ||  || — || April 6, 2008 || Mount Lemmon || Mount Lemmon Survey || — || align=right | 1.7 km || 
|-id=895 bgcolor=#d6d6d6
| 492895 ||  || — || March 5, 2006 || Kitt Peak || Spacewatch || — || align=right | 2.8 km || 
|-id=896 bgcolor=#fefefe
| 492896 ||  || — || September 18, 1995 || Kitt Peak || Spacewatch || MAS || align=right data-sort-value="0.71" | 710 m || 
|-id=897 bgcolor=#d6d6d6
| 492897 ||  || — || October 25, 2005 || Mount Lemmon || Mount Lemmon Survey || — || align=right | 2.4 km || 
|-id=898 bgcolor=#fefefe
| 492898 ||  || — || August 8, 2007 || Socorro || LINEAR || — || align=right data-sort-value="0.68" | 680 m || 
|-id=899 bgcolor=#fefefe
| 492899 ||  || — || June 18, 2010 || Mount Lemmon || Mount Lemmon Survey || — || align=right data-sort-value="0.87" | 870 m || 
|-id=900 bgcolor=#E9E9E9
| 492900 ||  || — || November 11, 2010 || Mount Lemmon || Mount Lemmon Survey || — || align=right | 1.7 km || 
|}

492901–493000 

|-bgcolor=#d6d6d6
| 492901 ||  || — || February 1, 2006 || Mount Lemmon || Mount Lemmon Survey || — || align=right | 2.3 km || 
|-id=902 bgcolor=#d6d6d6
| 492902 ||  || — || December 5, 1999 || Kitt Peak || Spacewatch || — || align=right | 2.8 km || 
|-id=903 bgcolor=#d6d6d6
| 492903 ||  || — || August 26, 2014 || Haleakala || Pan-STARRS || — || align=right | 3.0 km || 
|-id=904 bgcolor=#d6d6d6
| 492904 ||  || — || April 15, 2012 || Haleakala || Pan-STARRS || — || align=right | 2.3 km || 
|-id=905 bgcolor=#d6d6d6
| 492905 ||  || — || March 30, 2011 || Haleakala || Pan-STARRS || — || align=right | 3.9 km || 
|-id=906 bgcolor=#fefefe
| 492906 ||  || — || September 29, 2003 || Kitt Peak || Spacewatch || — || align=right data-sort-value="0.87" | 870 m || 
|-id=907 bgcolor=#E9E9E9
| 492907 ||  || — || October 29, 2010 || Catalina || CSS || — || align=right | 1.4 km || 
|-id=908 bgcolor=#E9E9E9
| 492908 ||  || — || March 2, 2012 || Mount Lemmon || Mount Lemmon Survey || MAR || align=right | 1.0 km || 
|-id=909 bgcolor=#d6d6d6
| 492909 ||  || — || October 22, 2008 || Mount Lemmon || Mount Lemmon Survey || — || align=right | 3.2 km || 
|-id=910 bgcolor=#d6d6d6
| 492910 ||  || — || August 31, 2014 || Haleakala || Pan-STARRS || — || align=right | 2.9 km || 
|-id=911 bgcolor=#d6d6d6
| 492911 ||  || — || May 15, 2012 || Mount Lemmon || Mount Lemmon Survey || EOS || align=right | 2.3 km || 
|-id=912 bgcolor=#FA8072
| 492912 ||  || — || October 13, 2004 || Kitt Peak || Spacewatch || — || align=right data-sort-value="0.62" | 620 m || 
|-id=913 bgcolor=#d6d6d6
| 492913 ||  || — || August 28, 2009 || Kitt Peak || Spacewatch || — || align=right | 2.7 km || 
|-id=914 bgcolor=#fefefe
| 492914 ||  || — || June 26, 2014 || Haleakala || Pan-STARRS || — || align=right data-sort-value="0.94" | 940 m || 
|-id=915 bgcolor=#E9E9E9
| 492915 ||  || — || October 3, 2005 || Kitt Peak || Spacewatch || — || align=right | 2.1 km || 
|-id=916 bgcolor=#d6d6d6
| 492916 ||  || — || February 27, 2012 || Haleakala || Pan-STARRS || — || align=right | 2.2 km || 
|-id=917 bgcolor=#d6d6d6
| 492917 ||  || — || September 16, 2009 || Kitt Peak || Spacewatch || — || align=right | 2.3 km || 
|-id=918 bgcolor=#d6d6d6
| 492918 ||  || — || January 30, 2011 || Mount Lemmon || Mount Lemmon Survey || EOS || align=right | 2.2 km || 
|-id=919 bgcolor=#d6d6d6
| 492919 ||  || — || December 20, 2009 || Kitt Peak || Spacewatch || — || align=right | 3.1 km || 
|-id=920 bgcolor=#E9E9E9
| 492920 ||  || — || December 14, 2010 || Mount Lemmon || Mount Lemmon Survey || — || align=right | 2.3 km || 
|-id=921 bgcolor=#d6d6d6
| 492921 ||  || — || August 15, 2009 || La Sagra || OAM Obs. || — || align=right | 2.1 km || 
|-id=922 bgcolor=#d6d6d6
| 492922 ||  || — || March 17, 2012 || Mount Lemmon || Mount Lemmon Survey || — || align=right | 2.7 km || 
|-id=923 bgcolor=#E9E9E9
| 492923 ||  || — || May 14, 2009 || Kitt Peak || Spacewatch || — || align=right | 1.2 km || 
|-id=924 bgcolor=#E9E9E9
| 492924 ||  || — || October 19, 2010 || Mount Lemmon || Mount Lemmon Survey || — || align=right | 1.7 km || 
|-id=925 bgcolor=#fefefe
| 492925 ||  || — || November 3, 2007 || Kitt Peak || Spacewatch || V || align=right data-sort-value="0.65" | 650 m || 
|-id=926 bgcolor=#E9E9E9
| 492926 ||  || — || October 1, 2005 || Mount Lemmon || Mount Lemmon Survey || AGN || align=right | 1.2 km || 
|-id=927 bgcolor=#fefefe
| 492927 ||  || — || October 9, 2007 || Mount Lemmon || Mount Lemmon Survey || — || align=right data-sort-value="0.90" | 900 m || 
|-id=928 bgcolor=#E9E9E9
| 492928 ||  || — || February 26, 2012 || Haleakala || Pan-STARRS || — || align=right | 2.6 km || 
|-id=929 bgcolor=#E9E9E9
| 492929 ||  || — || December 12, 2006 || Mount Lemmon || Mount Lemmon Survey || — || align=right | 1.5 km || 
|-id=930 bgcolor=#E9E9E9
| 492930 ||  || — || September 16, 2001 || Socorro || LINEAR || EUN || align=right | 1.2 km || 
|-id=931 bgcolor=#E9E9E9
| 492931 ||  || — || November 6, 2010 || Kitt Peak || Spacewatch || — || align=right | 1.2 km || 
|-id=932 bgcolor=#E9E9E9
| 492932 ||  || — || November 17, 2006 || Mount Lemmon || Mount Lemmon Survey || — || align=right | 1.0 km || 
|-id=933 bgcolor=#E9E9E9
| 492933 ||  || — || November 27, 2010 || Mount Lemmon || Mount Lemmon Survey || — || align=right | 1.3 km || 
|-id=934 bgcolor=#E9E9E9
| 492934 ||  || — || February 28, 2012 || Haleakala || Pan-STARRS || — || align=right | 2.2 km || 
|-id=935 bgcolor=#d6d6d6
| 492935 ||  || — || October 17, 2003 || Kitt Peak || Spacewatch || — || align=right | 2.5 km || 
|-id=936 bgcolor=#d6d6d6
| 492936 ||  || — || January 30, 2011 || Haleakala || Pan-STARRS || EOS || align=right | 1.4 km || 
|-id=937 bgcolor=#fefefe
| 492937 ||  || — || October 12, 2007 || Kitt Peak || Spacewatch || — || align=right data-sort-value="0.56" | 560 m || 
|-id=938 bgcolor=#fefefe
| 492938 ||  || — || April 21, 2006 || Catalina || CSS || — || align=right data-sort-value="0.98" | 980 m || 
|-id=939 bgcolor=#E9E9E9
| 492939 ||  || — || June 16, 2009 || Kitt Peak || Spacewatch || — || align=right | 2.4 km || 
|-id=940 bgcolor=#E9E9E9
| 492940 ||  || — || August 30, 2014 || Haleakala || Pan-STARRS || — || align=right | 2.4 km || 
|-id=941 bgcolor=#E9E9E9
| 492941 ||  || — || September 16, 2001 || Socorro || LINEAR || — || align=right | 1.8 km || 
|-id=942 bgcolor=#E9E9E9
| 492942 ||  || — || April 22, 2009 || Mount Lemmon || Mount Lemmon Survey || — || align=right data-sort-value="0.86" | 860 m || 
|-id=943 bgcolor=#d6d6d6
| 492943 ||  || — || October 25, 2005 || Mount Lemmon || Mount Lemmon Survey || KOR || align=right | 1.4 km || 
|-id=944 bgcolor=#E9E9E9
| 492944 ||  || — || December 10, 2010 || Mount Lemmon || Mount Lemmon Survey || — || align=right | 2.0 km || 
|-id=945 bgcolor=#d6d6d6
| 492945 ||  || — || December 4, 2005 || Mount Lemmon || Mount Lemmon Survey || KOR || align=right | 1.1 km || 
|-id=946 bgcolor=#E9E9E9
| 492946 ||  || — || November 13, 2010 || Mount Lemmon || Mount Lemmon Survey || — || align=right | 1.7 km || 
|-id=947 bgcolor=#d6d6d6
| 492947 ||  || — || September 16, 2009 || Kitt Peak || Spacewatch || — || align=right | 2.2 km || 
|-id=948 bgcolor=#d6d6d6
| 492948 ||  || — || November 6, 2010 || Mount Lemmon || Mount Lemmon Survey || — || align=right | 2.1 km || 
|-id=949 bgcolor=#fefefe
| 492949 ||  || — || April 18, 2013 || Kitt Peak || Spacewatch || — || align=right data-sort-value="0.99" | 990 m || 
|-id=950 bgcolor=#d6d6d6
| 492950 ||  || — || July 31, 2014 || Haleakala || Pan-STARRS || — || align=right | 2.8 km || 
|-id=951 bgcolor=#d6d6d6
| 492951 ||  || — || June 4, 2013 || Mount Lemmon || Mount Lemmon Survey || — || align=right | 2.1 km || 
|-id=952 bgcolor=#E9E9E9
| 492952 ||  || — || November 14, 2010 || Mount Lemmon || Mount Lemmon Survey || — || align=right | 1.8 km || 
|-id=953 bgcolor=#fefefe
| 492953 ||  || — || September 13, 2007 || Mount Lemmon || Mount Lemmon Survey || V || align=right data-sort-value="0.74" | 740 m || 
|-id=954 bgcolor=#E9E9E9
| 492954 ||  || — || February 25, 2012 || Mount Lemmon || Mount Lemmon Survey || — || align=right | 1.3 km || 
|-id=955 bgcolor=#E9E9E9
| 492955 ||  || — || February 28, 2008 || Kitt Peak || Spacewatch || — || align=right | 1.9 km || 
|-id=956 bgcolor=#E9E9E9
| 492956 ||  || — || May 16, 2013 || Haleakala || Pan-STARRS || — || align=right | 1.8 km || 
|-id=957 bgcolor=#E9E9E9
| 492957 ||  || — || February 12, 2008 || Kitt Peak || Spacewatch || — || align=right | 1.2 km || 
|-id=958 bgcolor=#E9E9E9
| 492958 ||  || — || September 11, 2010 || Mount Lemmon || Mount Lemmon Survey || — || align=right | 1.3 km || 
|-id=959 bgcolor=#E9E9E9
| 492959 ||  || — || July 30, 2014 || Haleakala || Pan-STARRS || — || align=right | 1.8 km || 
|-id=960 bgcolor=#E9E9E9
| 492960 ||  || — || October 25, 2005 || Mount Lemmon || Mount Lemmon Survey || — || align=right | 2.1 km || 
|-id=961 bgcolor=#d6d6d6
| 492961 ||  || — || February 25, 2011 || Mount Lemmon || Mount Lemmon Survey || — || align=right | 2.2 km || 
|-id=962 bgcolor=#E9E9E9
| 492962 ||  || — || September 27, 2005 || Kitt Peak || Spacewatch || — || align=right | 1.9 km || 
|-id=963 bgcolor=#E9E9E9
| 492963 ||  || — || November 12, 2005 || Kitt Peak || Spacewatch || AGN || align=right | 1.1 km || 
|-id=964 bgcolor=#d6d6d6
| 492964 ||  || — || September 15, 2009 || Kitt Peak || Spacewatch || KOR || align=right | 1.2 km || 
|-id=965 bgcolor=#d6d6d6
| 492965 ||  || — || September 18, 2014 || Haleakala || Pan-STARRS || — || align=right | 2.6 km || 
|-id=966 bgcolor=#d6d6d6
| 492966 ||  || — || January 23, 2006 || Kitt Peak || Spacewatch || — || align=right | 2.5 km || 
|-id=967 bgcolor=#d6d6d6
| 492967 ||  || — || September 18, 2014 || Haleakala || Pan-STARRS || — || align=right | 2.3 km || 
|-id=968 bgcolor=#d6d6d6
| 492968 ||  || — || March 29, 2010 || WISE || WISE || VER || align=right | 5.3 km || 
|-id=969 bgcolor=#d6d6d6
| 492969 ||  || — || April 15, 2012 || Haleakala || Pan-STARRS || — || align=right | 3.1 km || 
|-id=970 bgcolor=#E9E9E9
| 492970 ||  || — || March 10, 2008 || Kitt Peak || Spacewatch || — || align=right | 1.2 km || 
|-id=971 bgcolor=#E9E9E9
| 492971 ||  || — || October 1, 2000 || Socorro || LINEAR || — || align=right | 2.5 km || 
|-id=972 bgcolor=#d6d6d6
| 492972 ||  || — || March 14, 2007 || Mount Lemmon || Mount Lemmon Survey || — || align=right | 2.9 km || 
|-id=973 bgcolor=#E9E9E9
| 492973 ||  || — || August 30, 2014 || Haleakala || Pan-STARRS || — || align=right | 2.1 km || 
|-id=974 bgcolor=#d6d6d6
| 492974 ||  || — || December 10, 2005 || Kitt Peak || Spacewatch || 615 || align=right | 1.9 km || 
|-id=975 bgcolor=#d6d6d6
| 492975 ||  || — || May 2, 2006 || Kitt Peak || Spacewatch || — || align=right | 3.5 km || 
|-id=976 bgcolor=#fefefe
| 492976 ||  || — || April 26, 2006 || Kitt Peak || Spacewatch || — || align=right data-sort-value="0.72" | 720 m || 
|-id=977 bgcolor=#d6d6d6
| 492977 ||  || — || September 19, 2014 || Haleakala || Pan-STARRS || — || align=right | 3.0 km || 
|-id=978 bgcolor=#fefefe
| 492978 ||  || — || March 3, 2005 || Kitt Peak || Spacewatch || — || align=right data-sort-value="0.63" | 630 m || 
|-id=979 bgcolor=#E9E9E9
| 492979 ||  || — || February 16, 2007 || Mount Lemmon || Mount Lemmon Survey || — || align=right | 2.2 km || 
|-id=980 bgcolor=#E9E9E9
| 492980 ||  || — || February 27, 2012 || Haleakala || Pan-STARRS || HOF || align=right | 2.7 km || 
|-id=981 bgcolor=#d6d6d6
| 492981 ||  || — || April 3, 2011 || Haleakala || Pan-STARRS || — || align=right | 3.0 km || 
|-id=982 bgcolor=#d6d6d6
| 492982 ||  || — || November 18, 2003 || Kitt Peak || Spacewatch || VER || align=right | 2.7 km || 
|-id=983 bgcolor=#E9E9E9
| 492983 ||  || — || July 5, 2005 || Mount Lemmon || Mount Lemmon Survey || — || align=right data-sort-value="0.98" | 980 m || 
|-id=984 bgcolor=#fefefe
| 492984 ||  || — || August 3, 2010 || Socorro || LINEAR || — || align=right data-sort-value="0.89" | 890 m || 
|-id=985 bgcolor=#E9E9E9
| 492985 ||  || — || February 27, 2008 || Mount Lemmon || Mount Lemmon Survey || — || align=right | 1.4 km || 
|-id=986 bgcolor=#d6d6d6
| 492986 ||  || — || October 12, 2010 || Kitt Peak || Spacewatch || — || align=right | 2.8 km || 
|-id=987 bgcolor=#d6d6d6
| 492987 ||  || — || March 9, 2011 || Mount Lemmon || Mount Lemmon Survey || — || align=right | 2.9 km || 
|-id=988 bgcolor=#d6d6d6
| 492988 ||  || — || October 26, 2009 || Mount Lemmon || Mount Lemmon Survey || EOS || align=right | 2.0 km || 
|-id=989 bgcolor=#E9E9E9
| 492989 ||  || — || January 19, 2008 || Kitt Peak || Spacewatch || JUN || align=right | 1.3 km || 
|-id=990 bgcolor=#E9E9E9
| 492990 ||  || — || May 28, 2005 || Campo Imperatore || CINEOS || — || align=right | 1.3 km || 
|-id=991 bgcolor=#E9E9E9
| 492991 ||  || — || October 5, 2005 || Kitt Peak || Spacewatch || — || align=right | 1.6 km || 
|-id=992 bgcolor=#E9E9E9
| 492992 ||  || — || November 2, 2010 || Mount Lemmon || Mount Lemmon Survey || — || align=right | 1.7 km || 
|-id=993 bgcolor=#E9E9E9
| 492993 ||  || — || February 15, 2012 || Haleakala || Pan-STARRS || — || align=right | 1.3 km || 
|-id=994 bgcolor=#E9E9E9
| 492994 ||  || — || July 21, 2010 || WISE || WISE || (5) || align=right | 2.2 km || 
|-id=995 bgcolor=#E9E9E9
| 492995 ||  || — || August 20, 2014 || Haleakala || Pan-STARRS || — || align=right | 1.8 km || 
|-id=996 bgcolor=#d6d6d6
| 492996 ||  || — || March 3, 2006 || Kitt Peak || Spacewatch || — || align=right | 2.0 km || 
|-id=997 bgcolor=#d6d6d6
| 492997 ||  || — || December 9, 2010 || Kitt Peak || Spacewatch || KOR || align=right | 1.3 km || 
|-id=998 bgcolor=#d6d6d6
| 492998 ||  || — || January 30, 2006 || Kitt Peak || Spacewatch || — || align=right | 2.2 km || 
|-id=999 bgcolor=#fefefe
| 492999 ||  || — || March 19, 2013 || Haleakala || Pan-STARRS || — || align=right data-sort-value="0.84" | 840 m || 
|-id=000 bgcolor=#E9E9E9
| 493000 ||  || — || October 31, 2005 || Mount Lemmon || Mount Lemmon Survey || — || align=right | 2.2 km || 
|}

References

External links 
 Discovery Circumstances: Numbered Minor Planets (490001)–(495000) (IAU Minor Planet Center)

0492